

96001–96100 

|-bgcolor=#fefefe
| 96001 ||  || — || July 11, 2004 || Socorro || LINEAR || — || align=right | 1.4 km || 
|-id=002 bgcolor=#fefefe
| 96002 ||  || — || July 11, 2004 || Palomar || NEAT || — || align=right | 1.4 km || 
|-id=003 bgcolor=#fefefe
| 96003 ||  || — || July 15, 2004 || Socorro || LINEAR || — || align=right | 1.4 km || 
|-id=004 bgcolor=#E9E9E9
| 96004 ||  || — || July 15, 2004 || Socorro || LINEAR || — || align=right | 4.5 km || 
|-id=005 bgcolor=#fefefe
| 96005 ||  || — || July 11, 2004 || Socorro || LINEAR || V || align=right | 1.3 km || 
|-id=006 bgcolor=#FA8072
| 96006 ||  || — || July 11, 2004 || Socorro || LINEAR || — || align=right data-sort-value="0.91" | 910 m || 
|-id=007 bgcolor=#fefefe
| 96007 ||  || — || July 16, 2004 || Socorro || LINEAR || NYS || align=right | 1.5 km || 
|-id=008 bgcolor=#d6d6d6
| 96008 ||  || — || July 16, 2004 || Socorro || LINEAR || — || align=right | 3.0 km || 
|-id=009 bgcolor=#fefefe
| 96009 ||  || — || July 18, 2004 || Reedy Creek || J. Broughton || — || align=right | 2.0 km || 
|-id=010 bgcolor=#fefefe
| 96010 ||  || — || August 3, 2004 || Siding Spring || SSS || — || align=right | 3.5 km || 
|-id=011 bgcolor=#FA8072
| 96011 ||  || — || August 6, 2004 || Palomar || NEAT || — || align=right | 1.6 km || 
|-id=012 bgcolor=#fefefe
| 96012 ||  || — || August 6, 2004 || Palomar || NEAT || FLO || align=right data-sort-value="0.88" | 880 m || 
|-id=013 bgcolor=#fefefe
| 96013 ||  || — || August 6, 2004 || Palomar || NEAT || NYS || align=right | 1.3 km || 
|-id=014 bgcolor=#fefefe
| 96014 ||  || — || August 6, 2004 || Palomar || NEAT || NYS || align=right | 1.4 km || 
|-id=015 bgcolor=#E9E9E9
| 96015 ||  || — || August 6, 2004 || Palomar || NEAT || — || align=right | 2.6 km || 
|-id=016 bgcolor=#fefefe
| 96016 ||  || — || August 6, 2004 || Palomar || NEAT || NYS || align=right | 1.1 km || 
|-id=017 bgcolor=#fefefe
| 96017 ||  || — || August 6, 2004 || Palomar || NEAT || V || align=right | 1.2 km || 
|-id=018 bgcolor=#fefefe
| 96018 ||  || — || August 6, 2004 || Palomar || NEAT || V || align=right | 1.2 km || 
|-id=019 bgcolor=#E9E9E9
| 96019 ||  || — || August 6, 2004 || Palomar || NEAT || — || align=right | 4.9 km || 
|-id=020 bgcolor=#d6d6d6
| 96020 ||  || — || August 6, 2004 || Palomar || NEAT || — || align=right | 4.5 km || 
|-id=021 bgcolor=#E9E9E9
| 96021 ||  || — || August 7, 2004 || Palomar || NEAT || — || align=right | 2.7 km || 
|-id=022 bgcolor=#fefefe
| 96022 ||  || — || August 7, 2004 || Palomar || NEAT || — || align=right | 1.6 km || 
|-id=023 bgcolor=#fefefe
| 96023 ||  || — || August 8, 2004 || Socorro || LINEAR || EUT || align=right | 1.1 km || 
|-id=024 bgcolor=#fefefe
| 96024 ||  || — || August 8, 2004 || Anderson Mesa || LONEOS || — || align=right | 1.6 km || 
|-id=025 bgcolor=#fefefe
| 96025 ||  || — || August 8, 2004 || Anderson Mesa || LONEOS || — || align=right | 1.8 km || 
|-id=026 bgcolor=#d6d6d6
| 96026 ||  || — || August 9, 2004 || Reedy Creek || J. Broughton || — || align=right | 3.0 km || 
|-id=027 bgcolor=#fefefe
| 96027 ||  || — || August 6, 2004 || Palomar || NEAT || NYS || align=right data-sort-value="0.88" | 880 m || 
|-id=028 bgcolor=#d6d6d6
| 96028 ||  || — || August 8, 2004 || Campo Imperatore || CINEOS || VER || align=right | 5.6 km || 
|-id=029 bgcolor=#E9E9E9
| 96029 ||  || — || August 8, 2004 || Socorro || LINEAR || — || align=right | 4.3 km || 
|-id=030 bgcolor=#fefefe
| 96030 ||  || — || August 8, 2004 || Socorro || LINEAR || V || align=right | 1.3 km || 
|-id=031 bgcolor=#E9E9E9
| 96031 ||  || — || August 8, 2004 || Socorro || LINEAR || PAD || align=right | 2.5 km || 
|-id=032 bgcolor=#E9E9E9
| 96032 ||  || — || August 8, 2004 || Anderson Mesa || LONEOS || — || align=right | 3.4 km || 
|-id=033 bgcolor=#fefefe
| 96033 ||  || — || August 9, 2004 || Campo Imperatore || CINEOS || — || align=right | 1.4 km || 
|-id=034 bgcolor=#fefefe
| 96034 ||  || — || August 10, 2004 || Reedy Creek || J. Broughton || ERI || align=right | 3.3 km || 
|-id=035 bgcolor=#fefefe
| 96035 ||  || — || August 8, 2004 || Anderson Mesa || LONEOS || NYS || align=right | 1.4 km || 
|-id=036 bgcolor=#E9E9E9
| 96036 ||  || — || August 9, 2004 || Socorro || LINEAR || — || align=right | 3.2 km || 
|-id=037 bgcolor=#fefefe
| 96037 ||  || — || August 10, 2004 || Anderson Mesa || LONEOS || — || align=right | 1.7 km || 
|-id=038 bgcolor=#E9E9E9
| 96038 ||  || — || August 6, 2004 || Palomar || NEAT || — || align=right | 4.2 km || 
|-id=039 bgcolor=#fefefe
| 96039 ||  || — || August 9, 2004 || Socorro || LINEAR || — || align=right | 1.7 km || 
|-id=040 bgcolor=#d6d6d6
| 96040 ||  || — || August 10, 2004 || Socorro || LINEAR || — || align=right | 4.4 km || 
|-id=041 bgcolor=#fefefe
| 96041 ||  || — || August 10, 2004 || Socorro || LINEAR || — || align=right | 1.7 km || 
|-id=042 bgcolor=#E9E9E9
| 96042 ||  || — || August 10, 2004 || Socorro || LINEAR || — || align=right | 4.0 km || 
|-id=043 bgcolor=#d6d6d6
| 96043 ||  || — || August 12, 2004 || Reedy Creek || J. Broughton || — || align=right | 3.3 km || 
|-id=044 bgcolor=#d6d6d6
| 96044 ||  || — || August 13, 2004 || Reedy Creek || J. Broughton || — || align=right | 3.5 km || 
|-id=045 bgcolor=#d6d6d6
| 96045 ||  || — || August 14, 2004 || Reedy Creek || J. Broughton || — || align=right | 5.4 km || 
|-id=046 bgcolor=#E9E9E9
| 96046 ||  || — || August 11, 2004 || Socorro || LINEAR || — || align=right | 1.6 km || 
|-id=047 bgcolor=#d6d6d6
| 96047 ||  || — || August 21, 2004 || Reedy Creek || J. Broughton || — || align=right | 5.3 km || 
|-id=048 bgcolor=#fefefe
| 96048 ||  || — || August 21, 2004 || Siding Spring || SSS || — || align=right | 1.4 km || 
|-id=049 bgcolor=#d6d6d6
| 96049 ||  || — || August 21, 2004 || Siding Spring || SSS || EOS || align=right | 4.1 km || 
|-id=050 bgcolor=#d6d6d6
| 96050 ||  || — || August 21, 2004 || Catalina || CSS || — || align=right | 4.3 km || 
|-id=051 bgcolor=#d6d6d6
| 96051 || 2115 P-L || — || September 24, 1960 || Palomar || PLS || HYG || align=right | 5.0 km || 
|-id=052 bgcolor=#E9E9E9
| 96052 || 2134 P-L || — || September 24, 1960 || Palomar || PLS || — || align=right | 2.1 km || 
|-id=053 bgcolor=#d6d6d6
| 96053 || 2156 P-L || — || September 24, 1960 || Palomar || PLS || — || align=right | 6.0 km || 
|-id=054 bgcolor=#d6d6d6
| 96054 || 2189 P-L || — || September 24, 1960 || Palomar || PLS || — || align=right | 7.9 km || 
|-id=055 bgcolor=#d6d6d6
| 96055 || 2596 P-L || — || September 24, 1960 || Palomar || PLS || — || align=right | 6.0 km || 
|-id=056 bgcolor=#d6d6d6
| 96056 || 2704 P-L || — || September 24, 1960 || Palomar || PLS || — || align=right | 3.3 km || 
|-id=057 bgcolor=#fefefe
| 96057 || 2711 P-L || — || September 24, 1960 || Palomar || PLS || NYS || align=right | 3.2 km || 
|-id=058 bgcolor=#d6d6d6
| 96058 || 2831 P-L || — || September 24, 1960 || Palomar || PLS || — || align=right | 5.5 km || 
|-id=059 bgcolor=#d6d6d6
| 96059 || 3030 P-L || — || September 24, 1960 || Palomar || PLS || — || align=right | 7.0 km || 
|-id=060 bgcolor=#d6d6d6
| 96060 || 3103 P-L || — || September 24, 1960 || Palomar || PLS || EOS || align=right | 4.2 km || 
|-id=061 bgcolor=#d6d6d6
| 96061 || 4222 P-L || — || September 24, 1960 || Palomar || PLS || CHA || align=right | 3.5 km || 
|-id=062 bgcolor=#d6d6d6
| 96062 || 4558 P-L || — || September 24, 1960 || Palomar || PLS || HYG || align=right | 6.0 km || 
|-id=063 bgcolor=#fefefe
| 96063 || 4627 P-L || — || September 24, 1960 || Palomar || PLS || MAS || align=right | 1.3 km || 
|-id=064 bgcolor=#d6d6d6
| 96064 || 4772 P-L || — || September 24, 1960 || Palomar || PLS || — || align=right | 2.3 km || 
|-id=065 bgcolor=#d6d6d6
| 96065 || 4785 P-L || — || September 24, 1960 || Palomar || PLS || THM || align=right | 3.2 km || 
|-id=066 bgcolor=#E9E9E9
| 96066 || 4799 P-L || — || September 24, 1960 || Palomar || PLS || — || align=right | 2.1 km || 
|-id=067 bgcolor=#d6d6d6
| 96067 || 4810 P-L || — || September 24, 1960 || Palomar || PLS || — || align=right | 6.8 km || 
|-id=068 bgcolor=#d6d6d6
| 96068 || 4819 P-L || — || September 24, 1960 || Palomar || PLS || 7:4 || align=right | 8.1 km || 
|-id=069 bgcolor=#E9E9E9
| 96069 || 6060 P-L || — || September 24, 1960 || Palomar || PLS || fast || align=right | 2.6 km || 
|-id=070 bgcolor=#E9E9E9
| 96070 || 6078 P-L || — || September 24, 1960 || Palomar || PLS || JUN || align=right | 3.8 km || 
|-id=071 bgcolor=#E9E9E9
| 96071 || 6127 P-L || — || September 25, 1960 || Palomar || PLS || — || align=right | 2.5 km || 
|-id=072 bgcolor=#fefefe
| 96072 || 6222 P-L || — || September 24, 1960 || Palomar || PLS || — || align=right data-sort-value="0.94" | 940 m || 
|-id=073 bgcolor=#fefefe
| 96073 || 6677 P-L || — || September 24, 1960 || Palomar || PLS || — || align=right | 1.7 km || 
|-id=074 bgcolor=#fefefe
| 96074 || 6709 P-L || — || September 24, 1960 || Palomar || PLS || NYS || align=right | 1.1 km || 
|-id=075 bgcolor=#E9E9E9
| 96075 || 6736 P-L || — || September 24, 1960 || Palomar || PLS || — || align=right | 2.2 km || 
|-id=076 bgcolor=#fefefe
| 96076 || 6825 P-L || — || September 26, 1960 || Palomar || PLS || — || align=right | 1.3 km || 
|-id=077 bgcolor=#E9E9E9
| 96077 || 6840 P-L || — || September 24, 1960 || Palomar || PLS || — || align=right | 1.6 km || 
|-id=078 bgcolor=#fefefe
| 96078 || 6857 P-L || — || September 24, 1960 || Palomar || PLS || — || align=right | 3.5 km || 
|-id=079 bgcolor=#fefefe
| 96079 || 7583 P-L || — || October 22, 1960 || Palomar || PLS || — || align=right | 1.7 km || 
|-id=080 bgcolor=#FA8072
| 96080 || 7649 P-L || — || September 27, 1960 || Palomar || PLS || — || align=right | 1.3 km || 
|-id=081 bgcolor=#fefefe
| 96081 || 9079 P-L || — || October 17, 1960 || Palomar || PLS || NYS || align=right | 1.3 km || 
|-id=082 bgcolor=#d6d6d6
| 96082 || 9606 P-L || — || September 24, 1960 || Palomar || PLS || THM || align=right | 4.7 km || 
|-id=083 bgcolor=#fefefe
| 96083 || 1242 T-1 || — || March 25, 1971 || Palomar || PLS || — || align=right | 1.6 km || 
|-id=084 bgcolor=#fefefe
| 96084 || 2225 T-1 || — || March 25, 1971 || Palomar || PLS || — || align=right | 2.0 km || 
|-id=085 bgcolor=#fefefe
| 96085 || 2256 T-1 || — || March 25, 1971 || Palomar || PLS || — || align=right | 2.2 km || 
|-id=086 bgcolor=#d6d6d6
| 96086 Toscanos || 1006 T-2 ||  || September 29, 1973 || Palomar || PLS || 3:2 || align=right | 8.7 km || 
|-id=087 bgcolor=#fefefe
| 96087 || 1035 T-2 || — || September 29, 1973 || Palomar || PLS || PHO || align=right | 2.2 km || 
|-id=088 bgcolor=#E9E9E9
| 96088 || 1074 T-2 || — || September 29, 1973 || Palomar || PLS || — || align=right | 3.3 km || 
|-id=089 bgcolor=#E9E9E9
| 96089 || 1127 T-2 || — || September 29, 1973 || Palomar || PLS || — || align=right | 4.2 km || 
|-id=090 bgcolor=#fefefe
| 96090 || 1185 T-2 || — || September 29, 1973 || Palomar || PLS || — || align=right | 1.7 km || 
|-id=091 bgcolor=#d6d6d6
| 96091 || 1267 T-2 || — || September 30, 1973 || Palomar || PLS || — || align=right | 4.9 km || 
|-id=092 bgcolor=#d6d6d6
| 96092 || 2036 T-2 || — || September 29, 1973 || Palomar || PLS || — || align=right | 4.3 km || 
|-id=093 bgcolor=#E9E9E9
| 96093 || 2063 T-2 || — || September 29, 1973 || Palomar || PLS || — || align=right | 3.6 km || 
|-id=094 bgcolor=#fefefe
| 96094 || 2089 T-2 || — || September 29, 1973 || Palomar || PLS || FLO || align=right | 1.2 km || 
|-id=095 bgcolor=#E9E9E9
| 96095 || 2095 T-2 || — || September 29, 1973 || Palomar || PLS || HEN || align=right | 1.8 km || 
|-id=096 bgcolor=#fefefe
| 96096 || 2111 T-2 || — || September 29, 1973 || Palomar || PLS || V || align=right | 1.1 km || 
|-id=097 bgcolor=#fefefe
| 96097 || 2122 T-2 || — || September 29, 1973 || Palomar || PLS || — || align=right | 1.2 km || 
|-id=098 bgcolor=#d6d6d6
| 96098 || 2143 T-2 || — || September 29, 1973 || Palomar || PLS || — || align=right | 5.9 km || 
|-id=099 bgcolor=#d6d6d6
| 96099 || 2193 T-2 || — || September 29, 1973 || Palomar || PLS || — || align=right | 4.3 km || 
|-id=100 bgcolor=#fefefe
| 96100 || 2263 T-2 || — || September 29, 1973 || Palomar || PLS || — || align=right | 2.1 km || 
|}

96101–96200 

|-bgcolor=#fefefe
| 96101 || 3006 T-2 || — || September 30, 1973 || Palomar || PLS || — || align=right | 1.5 km || 
|-id=102 bgcolor=#fefefe
| 96102 || 3054 T-2 || — || September 30, 1973 || Palomar || PLS || — || align=right | 1.4 km || 
|-id=103 bgcolor=#E9E9E9
| 96103 || 3132 T-2 || — || September 30, 1973 || Palomar || PLS || — || align=right | 3.6 km || 
|-id=104 bgcolor=#fefefe
| 96104 || 3189 T-2 || — || September 30, 1973 || Palomar || PLS || — || align=right | 1.6 km || 
|-id=105 bgcolor=#fefefe
| 96105 || 3225 T-2 || — || September 30, 1973 || Palomar || PLS || — || align=right | 1.6 km || 
|-id=106 bgcolor=#fefefe
| 96106 || 3313 T-2 || — || September 25, 1973 || Palomar || PLS || FLO || align=right | 1.9 km || 
|-id=107 bgcolor=#fefefe
| 96107 || 4109 T-2 || — || September 29, 1973 || Palomar || PLS || — || align=right | 1.6 km || 
|-id=108 bgcolor=#E9E9E9
| 96108 || 4167 T-2 || — || September 29, 1973 || Palomar || PLS || — || align=right | 4.0 km || 
|-id=109 bgcolor=#E9E9E9
| 96109 || 4192 T-2 || — || September 29, 1973 || Palomar || PLS || — || align=right | 3.7 km || 
|-id=110 bgcolor=#fefefe
| 96110 || 4224 T-2 || — || September 29, 1973 || Palomar || PLS || FLO || align=right data-sort-value="0.85" | 850 m || 
|-id=111 bgcolor=#E9E9E9
| 96111 || 4243 T-2 || — || September 29, 1973 || Palomar || PLS || — || align=right | 2.5 km || 
|-id=112 bgcolor=#fefefe
| 96112 || 5063 T-2 || — || September 25, 1973 || Palomar || PLS || — || align=right | 2.8 km || 
|-id=113 bgcolor=#E9E9E9
| 96113 || 5083 T-2 || — || September 25, 1973 || Palomar || PLS || — || align=right | 3.4 km || 
|-id=114 bgcolor=#E9E9E9
| 96114 || 5088 T-2 || — || September 25, 1973 || Palomar || PLS || — || align=right | 4.0 km || 
|-id=115 bgcolor=#d6d6d6
| 96115 || 5139 T-2 || — || September 25, 1973 || Palomar || PLS || EOS || align=right | 4.1 km || 
|-id=116 bgcolor=#d6d6d6
| 96116 || 5412 T-2 || — || September 30, 1973 || Palomar || PLS || EOS || align=right | 3.2 km || 
|-id=117 bgcolor=#fefefe
| 96117 || 5458 T-2 || — || September 30, 1973 || Palomar || PLS || V || align=right | 1.8 km || 
|-id=118 bgcolor=#fefefe
| 96118 || 1087 T-3 || — || October 17, 1977 || Palomar || PLS || FLO || align=right | 2.5 km || 
|-id=119 bgcolor=#d6d6d6
| 96119 || 1091 T-3 || — || October 17, 1977 || Palomar || PLS || EOS || align=right | 4.4 km || 
|-id=120 bgcolor=#fefefe
| 96120 || 1114 T-3 || — || October 17, 1977 || Palomar || PLS || V || align=right | 1.2 km || 
|-id=121 bgcolor=#E9E9E9
| 96121 || 1127 T-3 || — || October 17, 1977 || Palomar || PLS || — || align=right | 5.1 km || 
|-id=122 bgcolor=#d6d6d6
| 96122 || 1141 T-3 || — || October 17, 1977 || Palomar || PLS || — || align=right | 6.3 km || 
|-id=123 bgcolor=#d6d6d6
| 96123 || 1184 T-3 || — || October 17, 1977 || Palomar || PLS || — || align=right | 5.9 km || 
|-id=124 bgcolor=#d6d6d6
| 96124 || 2058 T-3 || — || October 16, 1977 || Palomar || PLS || — || align=right | 8.1 km || 
|-id=125 bgcolor=#d6d6d6
| 96125 || 2152 T-3 || — || October 16, 1977 || Palomar || PLS || — || align=right | 4.7 km || 
|-id=126 bgcolor=#E9E9E9
| 96126 || 2174 T-3 || — || October 16, 1977 || Palomar || PLS || — || align=right | 4.0 km || 
|-id=127 bgcolor=#d6d6d6
| 96127 || 2202 T-3 || — || October 16, 1977 || Palomar || PLS || EOS || align=right | 3.6 km || 
|-id=128 bgcolor=#d6d6d6
| 96128 || 2220 T-3 || — || October 17, 1977 || Palomar || PLS || HYG || align=right | 4.3 km || 
|-id=129 bgcolor=#d6d6d6
| 96129 || 2248 T-3 || — || October 16, 1977 || Palomar || PLS || — || align=right | 5.8 km || 
|-id=130 bgcolor=#d6d6d6
| 96130 || 2269 T-3 || — || October 16, 1977 || Palomar || PLS || EOS || align=right | 3.7 km || 
|-id=131 bgcolor=#fefefe
| 96131 || 2276 T-3 || — || October 16, 1977 || Palomar || PLS || — || align=right | 6.3 km || 
|-id=132 bgcolor=#d6d6d6
| 96132 || 2354 T-3 || — || October 16, 1977 || Palomar || PLS || — || align=right | 4.9 km || 
|-id=133 bgcolor=#E9E9E9
| 96133 || 2488 T-3 || — || October 16, 1977 || Palomar || PLS || PAD || align=right | 4.0 km || 
|-id=134 bgcolor=#d6d6d6
| 96134 || 3027 T-3 || — || October 16, 1977 || Palomar || PLS || — || align=right | 5.5 km || 
|-id=135 bgcolor=#d6d6d6
| 96135 || 3054 T-3 || — || October 16, 1977 || Palomar || PLS || HYG || align=right | 4.8 km || 
|-id=136 bgcolor=#d6d6d6
| 96136 || 3209 T-3 || — || October 16, 1977 || Palomar || PLS || — || align=right | 6.9 km || 
|-id=137 bgcolor=#fefefe
| 96137 || 3252 T-3 || — || October 16, 1977 || Palomar || PLS || — || align=right | 1.4 km || 
|-id=138 bgcolor=#E9E9E9
| 96138 || 3277 T-3 || — || October 16, 1977 || Palomar || PLS || — || align=right | 3.7 km || 
|-id=139 bgcolor=#d6d6d6
| 96139 || 3324 T-3 || — || October 16, 1977 || Palomar || PLS || — || align=right | 4.8 km || 
|-id=140 bgcolor=#E9E9E9
| 96140 || 3339 T-3 || — || October 16, 1977 || Palomar || PLS || — || align=right | 4.0 km || 
|-id=141 bgcolor=#fefefe
| 96141 || 3359 T-3 || — || October 16, 1977 || Palomar || PLS || MAS || align=right | 1.2 km || 
|-id=142 bgcolor=#d6d6d6
| 96142 || 3425 T-3 || — || October 16, 1977 || Palomar || PLS || — || align=right | 5.0 km || 
|-id=143 bgcolor=#E9E9E9
| 96143 || 3434 T-3 || — || October 16, 1977 || Palomar || PLS || — || align=right | 3.0 km || 
|-id=144 bgcolor=#d6d6d6
| 96144 || 3466 T-3 || — || October 16, 1977 || Palomar || PLS || slow || align=right | 5.1 km || 
|-id=145 bgcolor=#d6d6d6
| 96145 || 3808 T-3 || — || October 16, 1977 || Palomar || PLS || — || align=right | 7.9 km || 
|-id=146 bgcolor=#fefefe
| 96146 || 3834 T-3 || — || October 16, 1977 || Palomar || PLS || NYS || align=right | 1.6 km || 
|-id=147 bgcolor=#d6d6d6
| 96147 || 3851 T-3 || — || October 16, 1977 || Palomar || PLS || — || align=right | 5.1 km || 
|-id=148 bgcolor=#d6d6d6
| 96148 || 3991 T-3 || — || October 16, 1977 || Palomar || PLS || — || align=right | 6.7 km || 
|-id=149 bgcolor=#E9E9E9
| 96149 || 4125 T-3 || — || October 16, 1977 || Palomar || PLS || CLO || align=right | 5.0 km || 
|-id=150 bgcolor=#fefefe
| 96150 || 4158 T-3 || — || October 16, 1977 || Palomar || PLS || V || align=right data-sort-value="0.89" | 890 m || 
|-id=151 bgcolor=#E9E9E9
| 96151 || 4239 T-3 || — || October 16, 1977 || Palomar || PLS || — || align=right | 3.9 km || 
|-id=152 bgcolor=#d6d6d6
| 96152 || 4358 T-3 || — || October 16, 1977 || Palomar || PLS || — || align=right | 6.6 km || 
|-id=153 bgcolor=#d6d6d6
| 96153 || 4651 T-3 || — || October 16, 1977 || Palomar || PLS || — || align=right | 7.2 km || 
|-id=154 bgcolor=#d6d6d6
| 96154 || 5121 T-3 || — || October 16, 1977 || Palomar || PLS || EOS || align=right | 4.2 km || 
|-id=155 bgcolor=#FA8072
| 96155 || 1973 HA || — || April 27, 1973 || Palomar || A. R. Sandage || — || align=right | 5.3 km || 
|-id=156 bgcolor=#fefefe
| 96156 || 1974 CB || — || February 14, 1974 || Harvard Observatory || Harvard Obs. || — || align=right | 4.3 km || 
|-id=157 bgcolor=#fefefe
| 96157 ||  || — || October 27, 1978 || Palomar || C. M. Olmstead || NYS || align=right | 1.5 km || 
|-id=158 bgcolor=#d6d6d6
| 96158 ||  || — || October 27, 1978 || Palomar || C. M. Olmstead || — || align=right | 4.9 km || 
|-id=159 bgcolor=#fefefe
| 96159 ||  || — || November 7, 1978 || Palomar || E. F. Helin, S. J. Bus || NYS || align=right | 1.1 km || 
|-id=160 bgcolor=#fefefe
| 96160 ||  || — || November 7, 1978 || Palomar || E. F. Helin, S. J. Bus || NYS || align=right | 1.3 km || 
|-id=161 bgcolor=#fefefe
| 96161 ||  || — || November 7, 1978 || Palomar || E. F. Helin, S. J. Bus || MAS || align=right | 1.4 km || 
|-id=162 bgcolor=#E9E9E9
| 96162 ||  || — || June 25, 1979 || Siding Spring || E. F. Helin, S. J. Bus || — || align=right | 3.0 km || 
|-id=163 bgcolor=#fefefe
| 96163 ||  || — || February 28, 1981 || Siding Spring || S. J. Bus || V || align=right | 1.4 km || 
|-id=164 bgcolor=#d6d6d6
| 96164 ||  || — || March 2, 1981 || Siding Spring || S. J. Bus || — || align=right | 3.9 km || 
|-id=165 bgcolor=#d6d6d6
| 96165 ||  || — || March 1, 1981 || Siding Spring || S. J. Bus || — || align=right | 7.0 km || 
|-id=166 bgcolor=#d6d6d6
| 96166 ||  || — || March 1, 1981 || Siding Spring || S. J. Bus || — || align=right | 2.3 km || 
|-id=167 bgcolor=#d6d6d6
| 96167 ||  || — || March 2, 1981 || Siding Spring || S. J. Bus || — || align=right | 6.1 km || 
|-id=168 bgcolor=#E9E9E9
| 96168 ||  || — || March 3, 1981 || Siding Spring || S. J. Bus || — || align=right | 1.7 km || 
|-id=169 bgcolor=#fefefe
| 96169 ||  || — || March 7, 1981 || Siding Spring || S. J. Bus || NYS || align=right | 1.4 km || 
|-id=170 bgcolor=#fefefe
| 96170 ||  || — || March 1, 1981 || Siding Spring || S. J. Bus || FLO || align=right | 1.4 km || 
|-id=171 bgcolor=#d6d6d6
| 96171 ||  || — || March 8, 1981 || Siding Spring || S. J. Bus || EOS || align=right | 4.3 km || 
|-id=172 bgcolor=#fefefe
| 96172 ||  || — || March 2, 1981 || Siding Spring || S. J. Bus || V || align=right | 1.7 km || 
|-id=173 bgcolor=#fefefe
| 96173 ||  || — || March 6, 1981 || Siding Spring || S. J. Bus || V || align=right | 2.3 km || 
|-id=174 bgcolor=#fefefe
| 96174 ||  || — || March 1, 1981 || Siding Spring || S. J. Bus || — || align=right | 1.1 km || 
|-id=175 bgcolor=#E9E9E9
| 96175 ||  || — || March 6, 1981 || Siding Spring || S. J. Bus || — || align=right | 2.1 km || 
|-id=176 bgcolor=#fefefe
| 96176 ||  || — || March 7, 1981 || Siding Spring || S. J. Bus || — || align=right | 1.9 km || 
|-id=177 bgcolor=#B88A00
| 96177 || 1984 BC || — || January 30, 1984 || Palomar || E. F. Helin, R. S. Dunbar || unusual || align=right | 3.4 km || 
|-id=178 bgcolor=#E9E9E9
| 96178 Rochambeau ||  ||  || September 29, 1987 || Anderson Mesa || E. Bowell || — || align=right | 2.4 km || 
|-id=179 bgcolor=#E9E9E9
| 96179 ||  || — || February 25, 1988 || Siding Spring || R. H. McNaught || — || align=right | 2.6 km || 
|-id=180 bgcolor=#d6d6d6
| 96180 ||  || — || September 16, 1988 || Cerro Tololo || S. J. Bus || 3:2 || align=right | 10 km || 
|-id=181 bgcolor=#E9E9E9
| 96181 ||  || — || November 8, 1988 || Kushiro || S. Ueda, H. Kaneda || — || align=right | 2.0 km || 
|-id=182 bgcolor=#fefefe
| 96182 ||  || — || September 6, 1989 || Palomar || E. F. Helin || — || align=right | 2.6 km || 
|-id=183 bgcolor=#fefefe
| 96183 ||  || — || October 27, 1989 || Palomar || E. F. Helin || — || align=right | 3.0 km || 
|-id=184 bgcolor=#E9E9E9
| 96184 ||  || — || August 28, 1990 || Palomar || H. E. Holt || — || align=right | 4.5 km || 
|-id=185 bgcolor=#E9E9E9
| 96185 ||  || — || September 13, 1990 || La Silla || H. Debehogne || — || align=right | 5.1 km || 
|-id=186 bgcolor=#fefefe
| 96186 ||  || — || September 22, 1990 || La Silla || E. W. Elst || — || align=right | 2.3 km || 
|-id=187 bgcolor=#d6d6d6
| 96187 ||  || — || October 16, 1990 || La Silla || E. W. Elst || — || align=right | 9.4 km || 
|-id=188 bgcolor=#fefefe
| 96188 || 1991 GC || — || April 8, 1991 || Palomar || E. F. Helin || PHO || align=right | 2.9 km || 
|-id=189 bgcolor=#FFC2E0
| 96189 Pygmalion ||  ||  || July 6, 1991 || La Silla || H. Debehogne || AMO +1km || align=right | 3.6 km || 
|-id=190 bgcolor=#E9E9E9
| 96190 ||  || — || August 2, 1991 || La Silla || E. W. Elst || — || align=right | 1.9 km || 
|-id=191 bgcolor=#E9E9E9
| 96191 ||  || — || October 3, 1991 || Kitt Peak || Spacewatch || — || align=right | 3.3 km || 
|-id=192 bgcolor=#fefefe
| 96192 Calgary ||  ||  || October 6, 1991 || Palomar || A. Lowe || V || align=right | 1.5 km || 
|-id=193 bgcolor=#E9E9E9
| 96193 Edmonton ||  ||  || October 6, 1991 || Palomar || A. Lowe || — || align=right | 1.4 km || 
|-id=194 bgcolor=#E9E9E9
| 96194 ||  || — || November 2, 1991 || La Silla || E. W. Elst || — || align=right | 4.8 km || 
|-id=195 bgcolor=#fefefe
| 96195 ||  || — || January 1, 1992 || Kitt Peak || Spacewatch || — || align=right | 2.0 km || 
|-id=196 bgcolor=#fefefe
| 96196 ||  || — || March 1, 1992 || La Silla || UESAC || — || align=right | 1.8 km || 
|-id=197 bgcolor=#E9E9E9
| 96197 ||  || — || March 1, 1992 || La Silla || UESAC || — || align=right | 4.1 km || 
|-id=198 bgcolor=#E9E9E9
| 96198 ||  || — || March 2, 1992 || La Silla || UESAC || — || align=right | 3.0 km || 
|-id=199 bgcolor=#fefefe
| 96199 ||  || — || March 4, 1992 || La Silla || UESAC || — || align=right | 1.8 km || 
|-id=200 bgcolor=#d6d6d6
| 96200 Oschin ||  ||  || August 25, 1992 || Palomar || A. Lowe || — || align=right | 4.1 km || 
|}

96201–96300 

|-bgcolor=#d6d6d6
| 96201 ||  || — || September 2, 1992 || La Silla || E. W. Elst || — || align=right | 4.1 km || 
|-id=202 bgcolor=#fefefe
| 96202 ||  || — || September 2, 1992 || La Silla || E. W. Elst || — || align=right | 1.6 km || 
|-id=203 bgcolor=#fefefe
| 96203 ||  || — || September 24, 1992 || Kitt Peak || Spacewatch || NYS || align=right | 1.2 km || 
|-id=204 bgcolor=#fefefe
| 96204 ||  || — || September 25, 1992 || Kitt Peak || Spacewatch || KLI || align=right | 5.4 km || 
|-id=205 bgcolor=#fefefe
| 96205 Ararat ||  ||  || September 24, 1992 || Tautenburg Observatory || F. Börngen, L. D. Schmadel || NYS || align=right | 1.4 km || 
|-id=206 bgcolor=#d6d6d6
| 96206 Eschenberg ||  ||  || September 24, 1992 || Tautenburg Observatory || F. Börngen, L. D. Schmadel || — || align=right | 5.6 km || 
|-id=207 bgcolor=#E9E9E9
| 96207 ||  || — || March 17, 1993 || La Silla || UESAC || — || align=right | 1.8 km || 
|-id=208 bgcolor=#fefefe
| 96208 ||  || — || March 17, 1993 || La Silla || UESAC || — || align=right | 2.2 km || 
|-id=209 bgcolor=#E9E9E9
| 96209 ||  || — || March 17, 1993 || La Silla || UESAC || — || align=right | 1.8 km || 
|-id=210 bgcolor=#E9E9E9
| 96210 ||  || — || March 17, 1993 || La Silla || UESAC || MRX || align=right | 2.4 km || 
|-id=211 bgcolor=#E9E9E9
| 96211 ||  || — || March 21, 1993 || La Silla || UESAC || — || align=right | 5.8 km || 
|-id=212 bgcolor=#fefefe
| 96212 ||  || — || March 21, 1993 || La Silla || UESAC || — || align=right | 1.6 km || 
|-id=213 bgcolor=#fefefe
| 96213 ||  || — || March 19, 1993 || La Silla || UESAC || — || align=right | 1.7 km || 
|-id=214 bgcolor=#E9E9E9
| 96214 ||  || — || March 19, 1993 || La Silla || UESAC || — || align=right | 2.2 km || 
|-id=215 bgcolor=#fefefe
| 96215 ||  || — || August 20, 1993 || La Silla || E. W. Elst || — || align=right | 1.7 km || 
|-id=216 bgcolor=#d6d6d6
| 96216 ||  || — || September 15, 1993 || Kitt Peak || Spacewatch || — || align=right | 5.3 km || 
|-id=217 bgcolor=#fefefe
| 96217 Gronchi ||  ||  || September 14, 1993 || Cima Ekar || A. Boattini, V. Goretti || FLO || align=right | 2.2 km || 
|-id=218 bgcolor=#fefefe
| 96218 ||  || — || September 15, 1993 || La Silla || E. W. Elst || H || align=right data-sort-value="0.94" | 940 m || 
|-id=219 bgcolor=#d6d6d6
| 96219 ||  || — || September 19, 1993 || Caussols || E. W. Elst || — || align=right | 6.3 km || 
|-id=220 bgcolor=#d6d6d6
| 96220 ||  || — || September 16, 1993 || La Silla || H. Debehogne, E. W. Elst || — || align=right | 5.7 km || 
|-id=221 bgcolor=#fefefe
| 96221 ||  || — || October 15, 1993 || Kitami || K. Endate, K. Watanabe || — || align=right | 2.5 km || 
|-id=222 bgcolor=#d6d6d6
| 96222 ||  || — || October 12, 1993 || Kitt Peak || Spacewatch || — || align=right | 4.9 km || 
|-id=223 bgcolor=#fefefe
| 96223 ||  || — || October 9, 1993 || La Silla || E. W. Elst || — || align=right | 2.0 km || 
|-id=224 bgcolor=#fefefe
| 96224 ||  || — || October 9, 1993 || La Silla || E. W. Elst || — || align=right | 1.7 km || 
|-id=225 bgcolor=#d6d6d6
| 96225 ||  || — || October 9, 1993 || La Silla || E. W. Elst || — || align=right | 5.5 km || 
|-id=226 bgcolor=#fefefe
| 96226 ||  || — || October 9, 1993 || La Silla || E. W. Elst || — || align=right | 3.8 km || 
|-id=227 bgcolor=#d6d6d6
| 96227 ||  || — || October 9, 1993 || La Silla || E. W. Elst || EOS || align=right | 3.3 km || 
|-id=228 bgcolor=#fefefe
| 96228 ||  || — || October 9, 1993 || La Silla || E. W. Elst || — || align=right | 2.8 km || 
|-id=229 bgcolor=#fefefe
| 96229 ||  || — || October 9, 1993 || La Silla || E. W. Elst || MAS || align=right | 1.3 km || 
|-id=230 bgcolor=#fefefe
| 96230 ||  || — || October 11, 1993 || La Silla || E. W. Elst || V || align=right | 1.6 km || 
|-id=231 bgcolor=#fefefe
| 96231 ||  || — || October 9, 1993 || La Silla || E. W. Elst || — || align=right | 1.7 km || 
|-id=232 bgcolor=#fefefe
| 96232 ||  || — || October 9, 1993 || La Silla || E. W. Elst || — || align=right | 1.4 km || 
|-id=233 bgcolor=#fefefe
| 96233 ||  || — || October 9, 1993 || La Silla || E. W. Elst || — || align=right | 1.7 km || 
|-id=234 bgcolor=#FA8072
| 96234 || 1993 UG || — || October 20, 1993 || Palomar || E. F. Helin || H || align=right | 1.7 km || 
|-id=235 bgcolor=#fefefe
| 96235 ||  || — || October 20, 1993 || La Silla || E. W. Elst || FLO || align=right | 1.4 km || 
|-id=236 bgcolor=#d6d6d6
| 96236 ||  || — || October 20, 1993 || La Silla || E. W. Elst || — || align=right | 3.5 km || 
|-id=237 bgcolor=#d6d6d6
| 96237 ||  || — || November 4, 1993 || Siding Spring || R. H. McNaught || — || align=right | 7.2 km || 
|-id=238 bgcolor=#fefefe
| 96238 ||  || — || January 4, 1994 || Kitt Peak || Spacewatch || NYS || align=right | 1.4 km || 
|-id=239 bgcolor=#d6d6d6
| 96239 ||  || — || January 7, 1994 || Kitt Peak || Spacewatch || — || align=right | 7.4 km || 
|-id=240 bgcolor=#fefefe
| 96240 ||  || — || January 7, 1994 || Kitt Peak || Spacewatch || NYS || align=right | 3.6 km || 
|-id=241 bgcolor=#fefefe
| 96241 ||  || — || January 7, 1994 || Kitt Peak || Spacewatch || MAS || align=right | 1.3 km || 
|-id=242 bgcolor=#E9E9E9
| 96242 ||  || — || January 13, 1994 || Kitt Peak || Spacewatch || — || align=right | 2.3 km || 
|-id=243 bgcolor=#d6d6d6
| 96243 ||  || — || February 12, 1994 || Kitt Peak || Spacewatch || — || align=right | 5.4 km || 
|-id=244 bgcolor=#fefefe
| 96244 ||  || — || February 8, 1994 || La Silla || E. W. Elst || — || align=right | 2.4 km || 
|-id=245 bgcolor=#fefefe
| 96245 ||  || — || February 8, 1994 || La Silla || E. W. Elst || NYS || align=right | 4.1 km || 
|-id=246 bgcolor=#E9E9E9
| 96246 ||  || — || May 4, 1994 || Kitt Peak || Spacewatch || — || align=right | 2.7 km || 
|-id=247 bgcolor=#E9E9E9
| 96247 ||  || — || August 10, 1994 || La Silla || E. W. Elst || WIT || align=right | 2.0 km || 
|-id=248 bgcolor=#E9E9E9
| 96248 ||  || — || August 10, 1994 || La Silla || E. W. Elst || — || align=right | 1.9 km || 
|-id=249 bgcolor=#fefefe
| 96249 ||  || — || August 12, 1994 || La Silla || E. W. Elst || — || align=right data-sort-value="0.99" | 990 m || 
|-id=250 bgcolor=#E9E9E9
| 96250 ||  || — || August 12, 1994 || La Silla || E. W. Elst || — || align=right | 4.3 km || 
|-id=251 bgcolor=#E9E9E9
| 96251 ||  || — || September 5, 1994 || La Silla || E. W. Elst || HOF || align=right | 4.8 km || 
|-id=252 bgcolor=#fefefe
| 96252 ||  || — || November 28, 1994 || Kitt Peak || Spacewatch || — || align=right | 1.6 km || 
|-id=253 bgcolor=#fefefe
| 96253 ||  || — || January 28, 1995 || Oohira || T. Urata || — || align=right | 2.1 km || 
|-id=254 bgcolor=#fefefe
| 96254 Hoyo ||  ||  || February 27, 1995 || Kuma Kogen || A. Nakamura || — || align=right | 1.5 km || 
|-id=255 bgcolor=#d6d6d6
| 96255 ||  || — || March 2, 1995 || Kitt Peak || Spacewatch || THM || align=right | 4.4 km || 
|-id=256 bgcolor=#fefefe
| 96256 ||  || — || April 25, 1995 || Kitt Peak || Spacewatch || NYS || align=right | 1.5 km || 
|-id=257 bgcolor=#fefefe
| 96257 || 1995 JE || — || May 3, 1995 || La Silla || S. Mottola || — || align=right | 1.8 km || 
|-id=258 bgcolor=#fefefe
| 96258 ||  || — || May 27, 1995 || Kitt Peak || Spacewatch || — || align=right | 1.3 km || 
|-id=259 bgcolor=#fefefe
| 96259 ||  || — || June 23, 1995 || Kitt Peak || Spacewatch || — || align=right | 2.3 km || 
|-id=260 bgcolor=#d6d6d6
| 96260 ||  || — || June 29, 1995 || Kitt Peak || Spacewatch || — || align=right | 7.8 km || 
|-id=261 bgcolor=#fefefe
| 96261 ||  || — || July 22, 1995 || Kitt Peak || Spacewatch || NYS || align=right | 1.4 km || 
|-id=262 bgcolor=#E9E9E9
| 96262 || 1995 PF || — || August 1, 1995 || Farra d'Isonzo || Farra d'Isonzo || EUN || align=right | 2.7 km || 
|-id=263 bgcolor=#E9E9E9
| 96263 Lorettacavicchi ||  ||  || September 23, 1995 || Bologna || San Vittore Obs. || EUN || align=right | 2.6 km || 
|-id=264 bgcolor=#E9E9E9
| 96264 ||  || — || September 18, 1995 || Kitt Peak || Spacewatch || — || align=right | 2.4 km || 
|-id=265 bgcolor=#E9E9E9
| 96265 ||  || — || September 19, 1995 || Kitt Peak || Spacewatch || — || align=right | 1.7 km || 
|-id=266 bgcolor=#E9E9E9
| 96266 ||  || — || September 21, 1995 || Kitt Peak || Spacewatch || — || align=right | 1.9 km || 
|-id=267 bgcolor=#E9E9E9
| 96267 ||  || — || September 26, 1995 || Kitt Peak || Spacewatch || — || align=right | 3.2 km || 
|-id=268 bgcolor=#E9E9E9
| 96268 Tomcarr ||  ||  || September 20, 1995 || Catalina Station || T. B. Spahr || — || align=right | 2.6 km || 
|-id=269 bgcolor=#E9E9E9
| 96269 ||  || — || September 17, 1995 || Kitt Peak || Spacewatch || — || align=right | 1.3 km || 
|-id=270 bgcolor=#E9E9E9
| 96270 ||  || — || September 27, 1995 || Kitt Peak || Spacewatch || — || align=right | 2.0 km || 
|-id=271 bgcolor=#E9E9E9
| 96271 ||  || — || September 21, 1995 || Kitt Peak || Spacewatch || MAR || align=right | 2.7 km || 
|-id=272 bgcolor=#E9E9E9
| 96272 ||  || — || September 29, 1995 || Kitt Peak || Spacewatch || — || align=right | 3.7 km || 
|-id=273 bgcolor=#fefefe
| 96273 ||  || — || October 17, 1995 || Kitt Peak || Spacewatch || — || align=right | 1.6 km || 
|-id=274 bgcolor=#E9E9E9
| 96274 ||  || — || October 21, 1995 || Kitt Peak || Spacewatch || — || align=right | 2.1 km || 
|-id=275 bgcolor=#E9E9E9
| 96275 ||  || — || October 17, 1995 || Kitt Peak || Spacewatch || — || align=right | 3.7 km || 
|-id=276 bgcolor=#E9E9E9
| 96276 ||  || — || November 15, 1995 || Kitt Peak || Spacewatch || — || align=right | 4.9 km || 
|-id=277 bgcolor=#E9E9E9
| 96277 ||  || — || November 20, 1995 || Oizumi || T. Kobayashi || — || align=right | 3.3 km || 
|-id=278 bgcolor=#E9E9E9
| 96278 ||  || — || November 17, 1995 || Kitt Peak || Spacewatch || — || align=right | 3.0 km || 
|-id=279 bgcolor=#E9E9E9
| 96279 ||  || — || November 17, 1995 || Kitt Peak || Spacewatch || — || align=right | 3.5 km || 
|-id=280 bgcolor=#E9E9E9
| 96280 ||  || — || November 19, 1995 || Kitt Peak || Spacewatch || — || align=right | 2.4 km || 
|-id=281 bgcolor=#E9E9E9
| 96281 ||  || — || November 21, 1995 || Kitt Peak || Spacewatch || — || align=right | 3.6 km || 
|-id=282 bgcolor=#E9E9E9
| 96282 ||  || — || November 23, 1995 || Kitt Peak || Spacewatch || — || align=right | 4.6 km || 
|-id=283 bgcolor=#E9E9E9
| 96283 ||  || — || December 16, 1995 || Kitt Peak || Spacewatch || — || align=right | 2.2 km || 
|-id=284 bgcolor=#E9E9E9
| 96284 ||  || — || December 18, 1995 || Kitt Peak || Spacewatch || — || align=right | 2.9 km || 
|-id=285 bgcolor=#E9E9E9
| 96285 ||  || — || December 20, 1995 || Haleakala || NEAT || — || align=right | 3.0 km || 
|-id=286 bgcolor=#E9E9E9
| 96286 ||  || — || January 15, 1996 || Kitt Peak || Spacewatch || HOF || align=right | 5.4 km || 
|-id=287 bgcolor=#E9E9E9
| 96287 ||  || — || January 20, 1996 || Kitt Peak || Spacewatch || — || align=right | 4.2 km || 
|-id=288 bgcolor=#fefefe
| 96288 ||  || — || April 11, 1996 || Kitt Peak || Spacewatch || FLO || align=right | 2.1 km || 
|-id=289 bgcolor=#d6d6d6
| 96289 ||  || — || April 17, 1996 || La Silla || E. W. Elst || — || align=right | 8.3 km || 
|-id=290 bgcolor=#fefefe
| 96290 ||  || — || April 18, 1996 || La Silla || E. W. Elst || — || align=right | 2.4 km || 
|-id=291 bgcolor=#fefefe
| 96291 ||  || — || April 18, 1996 || La Silla || E. W. Elst || FLO || align=right | 1.3 km || 
|-id=292 bgcolor=#d6d6d6
| 96292 ||  || — || April 18, 1996 || La Silla || E. W. Elst || EOS || align=right | 4.6 km || 
|-id=293 bgcolor=#fefefe
| 96293 ||  || — || April 20, 1996 || La Silla || E. W. Elst || FLO || align=right | 1.6 km || 
|-id=294 bgcolor=#d6d6d6
| 96294 ||  || — || May 11, 1996 || Xinglong || SCAP || TIR || align=right | 6.4 km || 
|-id=295 bgcolor=#C2FFFF
| 96295 ||  || — || May 11, 1996 || Kitt Peak || Spacewatch || L5 || align=right | 19 km || 
|-id=296 bgcolor=#d6d6d6
| 96296 ||  || — || July 20, 1996 || Xinglong || SCAP || ALA || align=right | 7.9 km || 
|-id=297 bgcolor=#E9E9E9
| 96297 ||  || — || September 13, 1996 || Haleakala || NEAT || — || align=right | 2.1 km || 
|-id=298 bgcolor=#fefefe
| 96298 ||  || — || September 6, 1996 || Siding Spring || G. J. Garradd || H || align=right | 2.9 km || 
|-id=299 bgcolor=#fefefe
| 96299 || 1996 SO || — || September 18, 1996 || Prescott || P. G. Comba || — || align=right | 1.5 km || 
|-id=300 bgcolor=#fefefe
| 96300 ||  || — || September 21, 1996 || Xinglong || SCAP || NYS || align=right | 1.3 km || 
|}

96301–96400 

|-bgcolor=#d6d6d6
| 96301 ||  || — || October 7, 1996 || Kitt Peak || Spacewatch || — || align=right | 4.3 km || 
|-id=302 bgcolor=#fefefe
| 96302 ||  || — || October 8, 1996 || La Silla || E. W. Elst || NYS || align=right | 1.7 km || 
|-id=303 bgcolor=#fefefe
| 96303 ||  || — || October 17, 1996 || La Silla || C.-I. Lagerkvist || EUT || align=right | 1.0 km || 
|-id=304 bgcolor=#fefefe
| 96304 ||  || — || November 5, 1996 || Kitt Peak || Spacewatch || — || align=right | 1.7 km || 
|-id=305 bgcolor=#fefefe
| 96305 ||  || — || November 10, 1996 || Kitt Peak || Spacewatch || V || align=right | 1.7 km || 
|-id=306 bgcolor=#fefefe
| 96306 ||  || — || November 20, 1996 || Xinglong || SCAP || — || align=right | 2.8 km || 
|-id=307 bgcolor=#E9E9E9
| 96307 ||  || — || December 4, 1996 || Pleiade || P. Antolini, F. Castellani || — || align=right | 5.2 km || 
|-id=308 bgcolor=#fefefe
| 96308 ||  || — || December 12, 1996 || Kitt Peak || Spacewatch || V || align=right | 1.6 km || 
|-id=309 bgcolor=#fefefe
| 96309 ||  || — || December 12, 1996 || Kitt Peak || Spacewatch || V || align=right | 1.4 km || 
|-id=310 bgcolor=#E9E9E9
| 96310 ||  || — || December 14, 1996 || Goodricke-Pigott || R. A. Tucker || — || align=right | 4.2 km || 
|-id=311 bgcolor=#E9E9E9
| 96311 ||  || — || December 11, 1996 || Kitt Peak || Spacewatch || — || align=right | 1.8 km || 
|-id=312 bgcolor=#fefefe
| 96312 ||  || — || December 12, 1996 || Kitt Peak || Spacewatch || NYS || align=right | 1.1 km || 
|-id=313 bgcolor=#E9E9E9
| 96313 ||  || — || January 3, 1997 || Kitt Peak || Spacewatch || — || align=right | 4.2 km || 
|-id=314 bgcolor=#E9E9E9
| 96314 ||  || — || January 8, 1997 || Prescott || P. G. Comba || HNS || align=right | 3.1 km || 
|-id=315 bgcolor=#FFC2E0
| 96315 ||  || — || January 9, 1997 || Kitt Peak || Spacewatch || APO +1km || align=right | 1.4 km || 
|-id=316 bgcolor=#E9E9E9
| 96316 ||  || — || January 11, 1997 || Kitt Peak || Spacewatch || — || align=right | 2.6 km || 
|-id=317 bgcolor=#E9E9E9
| 96317 ||  || — || January 30, 1997 || Oizumi || T. Kobayashi || EUN || align=right | 2.4 km || 
|-id=318 bgcolor=#E9E9E9
| 96318 ||  || — || February 1, 1997 || Oizumi || T. Kobayashi || — || align=right | 2.6 km || 
|-id=319 bgcolor=#E9E9E9
| 96319 ||  || — || February 1, 1997 || Chichibu || N. Satō || — || align=right | 4.6 km || 
|-id=320 bgcolor=#E9E9E9
| 96320 ||  || — || February 6, 1997 || Kitt Peak || Spacewatch || — || align=right | 4.4 km || 
|-id=321 bgcolor=#E9E9E9
| 96321 ||  || — || February 6, 1997 || Chichibu || N. Satō || — || align=right | 3.5 km || 
|-id=322 bgcolor=#fefefe
| 96322 ||  || — || February 12, 1997 || Oizumi || T. Kobayashi || H || align=right | 2.0 km || 
|-id=323 bgcolor=#fefefe
| 96323 ||  || — || February 14, 1997 || Oizumi || T. Kobayashi || H || align=right | 1.3 km || 
|-id=324 bgcolor=#E9E9E9
| 96324 ||  || — || March 4, 1997 || Oizumi || T. Kobayashi || — || align=right | 2.9 km || 
|-id=325 bgcolor=#E9E9E9
| 96325 ||  || — || March 3, 1997 || Kitt Peak || Spacewatch || — || align=right | 3.4 km || 
|-id=326 bgcolor=#E9E9E9
| 96326 ||  || — || March 3, 1997 || Xinglong || SCAP || — || align=right | 3.6 km || 
|-id=327 bgcolor=#fefefe
| 96327 Ullmann ||  ||  || March 5, 1997 || La Silla || E. W. Elst || H || align=right | 1.8 km || 
|-id=328 bgcolor=#E9E9E9
| 96328 || 1997 GC || — || April 2, 1997 || Ondřejov || L. Kotková || — || align=right | 2.8 km || 
|-id=329 bgcolor=#E9E9E9
| 96329 ||  || — || April 3, 1997 || Socorro || LINEAR || — || align=right | 1.8 km || 
|-id=330 bgcolor=#E9E9E9
| 96330 ||  || — || April 3, 1997 || Socorro || LINEAR || — || align=right | 3.8 km || 
|-id=331 bgcolor=#E9E9E9
| 96331 ||  || — || April 6, 1997 || Socorro || LINEAR || MRX || align=right | 1.9 km || 
|-id=332 bgcolor=#E9E9E9
| 96332 ||  || — || April 3, 1997 || Socorro || LINEAR || — || align=right | 5.4 km || 
|-id=333 bgcolor=#E9E9E9
| 96333 ||  || — || April 6, 1997 || Socorro || LINEAR || MIS || align=right | 4.2 km || 
|-id=334 bgcolor=#fefefe
| 96334 ||  || — || April 30, 1997 || Socorro || LINEAR || H || align=right | 1.6 km || 
|-id=335 bgcolor=#d6d6d6
| 96335 ||  || — || May 9, 1997 || Mauna Kea || C. Veillet || EOS || align=right | 3.9 km || 
|-id=336 bgcolor=#d6d6d6
| 96336 ||  || — || May 28, 1997 || Kitt Peak || Spacewatch || — || align=right | 6.2 km || 
|-id=337 bgcolor=#C2FFFF
| 96337 ||  || — || June 5, 1997 || Kitt Peak || Spacewatch || L5 || align=right | 11 km || 
|-id=338 bgcolor=#d6d6d6
| 96338 ||  || — || June 1, 1997 || Kitt Peak || Spacewatch || EOS || align=right | 3.4 km || 
|-id=339 bgcolor=#fefefe
| 96339 ||  || — || June 29, 1997 || Socorro || LINEAR || — || align=right | 1.9 km || 
|-id=340 bgcolor=#E9E9E9
| 96340 ||  || — || July 8, 1997 || Caussols || ODAS || ADE || align=right | 4.8 km || 
|-id=341 bgcolor=#fefefe
| 96341 ||  || — || July 31, 1997 || Farra d'Isonzo || Farra d'Isonzo || — || align=right | 1.7 km || 
|-id=342 bgcolor=#fefefe
| 96342 ||  || — || August 8, 1997 || Ondřejov || P. Pravec || — || align=right | 1.3 km || 
|-id=343 bgcolor=#d6d6d6
| 96343 ||  || — || September 3, 1997 || Bédoin || P. Antonini || — || align=right | 6.6 km || 
|-id=344 bgcolor=#fefefe
| 96344 Scottweaver ||  ||  || September 5, 1997 || Alfred University || A. Robbins || — || align=right | 1.5 km || 
|-id=345 bgcolor=#d6d6d6
| 96345 ||  || — || September 8, 1997 || Caussols || ODAS || — || align=right | 7.9 km || 
|-id=346 bgcolor=#fefefe
| 96346 ||  || — || September 23, 1997 || Xinglong || SCAP || FLO || align=right | 2.2 km || 
|-id=347 bgcolor=#d6d6d6
| 96347 ||  || — || September 28, 1997 || Kitt Peak || Spacewatch || — || align=right | 4.8 km || 
|-id=348 bgcolor=#fefefe
| 96348 Toshiyukimariko ||  ||  || October 7, 1997 || Nanyo || T. Okuni || — || align=right | 2.3 km || 
|-id=349 bgcolor=#fefefe
| 96349 ||  || — || October 23, 1997 || Ondřejov || L. Kotková || — || align=right | 2.3 km || 
|-id=350 bgcolor=#fefefe
| 96350 ||  || — || October 26, 1997 || Nachi-Katsuura || Y. Shimizu, T. Urata || — || align=right | 2.2 km || 
|-id=351 bgcolor=#fefefe
| 96351 ||  || — || October 28, 1997 || Kitt Peak || Spacewatch || — || align=right | 1.7 km || 
|-id=352 bgcolor=#fefefe
| 96352 ||  || — || November 1, 1997 || Oizumi || T. Kobayashi || — || align=right | 2.7 km || 
|-id=353 bgcolor=#fefefe
| 96353 ||  || — || November 6, 1997 || Oizumi || T. Kobayashi || — || align=right | 1.8 km || 
|-id=354 bgcolor=#fefefe
| 96354 ||  || — || November 6, 1997 || Oizumi || T. Kobayashi || — || align=right | 1.6 km || 
|-id=355 bgcolor=#fefefe
| 96355 ||  || — || November 11, 1997 || Kleť || Kleť Obs. || — || align=right | 1.4 km || 
|-id=356 bgcolor=#fefefe
| 96356 ||  || — || November 10, 1997 || Ondřejov || L. Kotková || FLO || align=right | 1.5 km || 
|-id=357 bgcolor=#fefefe
| 96357 ||  || — || November 23, 1997 || Kitt Peak || Spacewatch || — || align=right | 1.4 km || 
|-id=358 bgcolor=#fefefe
| 96358 ||  || — || November 23, 1997 || Kitt Peak || Spacewatch || — || align=right | 1.3 km || 
|-id=359 bgcolor=#fefefe
| 96359 ||  || — || November 22, 1997 || Kitt Peak || Spacewatch || — || align=right data-sort-value="0.91" | 910 m || 
|-id=360 bgcolor=#E9E9E9
| 96360 ||  || — || November 22, 1997 || Kitt Peak || Spacewatch || — || align=right | 3.7 km || 
|-id=361 bgcolor=#fefefe
| 96361 ||  || — || November 22, 1997 || Kitt Peak || Spacewatch || NYS || align=right | 1.8 km || 
|-id=362 bgcolor=#fefefe
| 96362 ||  || — || November 23, 1997 || Kitt Peak || Spacewatch || FLO || align=right | 1.3 km || 
|-id=363 bgcolor=#fefefe
| 96363 ||  || — || November 25, 1997 || Kitt Peak || Spacewatch || FLO || align=right | 1.5 km || 
|-id=364 bgcolor=#fefefe
| 96364 ||  || — || November 23, 1997 || Kitt Peak || Spacewatch || — || align=right | 2.0 km || 
|-id=365 bgcolor=#fefefe
| 96365 ||  || — || November 22, 1997 || Kitt Peak || Spacewatch || — || align=right | 2.0 km || 
|-id=366 bgcolor=#fefefe
| 96366 ||  || — || November 29, 1997 || Socorro || LINEAR || NYS || align=right | 1.6 km || 
|-id=367 bgcolor=#fefefe
| 96367 ||  || — || November 29, 1997 || Socorro || LINEAR || — || align=right | 1.8 km || 
|-id=368 bgcolor=#fefefe
| 96368 ||  || — || December 3, 1997 || Chichibu || N. Satō || NYS || align=right | 1.6 km || 
|-id=369 bgcolor=#fefefe
| 96369 ||  || — || December 3, 1997 || Chichibu || N. Satō || FLO || align=right | 1.7 km || 
|-id=370 bgcolor=#fefefe
| 96370 ||  || — || December 1, 1997 || Xinglong || SCAP || FLO || align=right | 1.3 km || 
|-id=371 bgcolor=#fefefe
| 96371 ||  || — || December 7, 1997 || Caussols || ODAS || — || align=right | 1.6 km || 
|-id=372 bgcolor=#fefefe
| 96372 ||  || — || December 24, 1997 || Chichibu || N. Satō || — || align=right | 1.6 km || 
|-id=373 bgcolor=#fefefe
| 96373 ||  || — || December 27, 1997 || Oizumi || T. Kobayashi || — || align=right | 2.5 km || 
|-id=374 bgcolor=#fefefe
| 96374 ||  || — || December 31, 1997 || Oizumi || T. Kobayashi || — || align=right | 2.0 km || 
|-id=375 bgcolor=#fefefe
| 96375 ||  || — || December 31, 1997 || Kitt Peak || Spacewatch || — || align=right | 1.8 km || 
|-id=376 bgcolor=#fefefe
| 96376 || 1998 AY || — || January 5, 1998 || Oizumi || T. Kobayashi || — || align=right | 1.7 km || 
|-id=377 bgcolor=#fefefe
| 96377 ||  || — || January 4, 1998 || Xinglong || SCAP || — || align=right | 1.9 km || 
|-id=378 bgcolor=#fefefe
| 96378 || 1998 BA || — || January 16, 1998 || Oizumi || T. Kobayashi || — || align=right | 2.2 km || 
|-id=379 bgcolor=#fefefe
| 96379 || 1998 BH || — || January 18, 1998 || Modra || P. Kolény, L. Kornoš || V || align=right | 1.5 km || 
|-id=380 bgcolor=#fefefe
| 96380 ||  || — || January 19, 1998 || Oizumi || T. Kobayashi || FLO || align=right | 2.3 km || 
|-id=381 bgcolor=#fefefe
| 96381 ||  || — || January 22, 1998 || Kitt Peak || Spacewatch || FLO || align=right | 1.2 km || 
|-id=382 bgcolor=#fefefe
| 96382 ||  || — || January 22, 1998 || Stroncone || Santa Lucia Obs. || — || align=right | 1.4 km || 
|-id=383 bgcolor=#fefefe
| 96383 ||  || — || January 24, 1998 || Haleakala || NEAT || — || align=right | 2.4 km || 
|-id=384 bgcolor=#fefefe
| 96384 ||  || — || January 22, 1998 || Kitt Peak || Spacewatch || FLO || align=right | 1.5 km || 
|-id=385 bgcolor=#fefefe
| 96385 ||  || — || January 28, 1998 || Oizumi || T. Kobayashi || V || align=right | 2.1 km || 
|-id=386 bgcolor=#fefefe
| 96386 ||  || — || January 26, 1998 || Haleakala || NEAT || — || align=right | 3.5 km || 
|-id=387 bgcolor=#fefefe
| 96387 ||  || — || January 19, 1998 || Goodricke-Pigott || R. A. Tucker || — || align=right | 2.0 km || 
|-id=388 bgcolor=#fefefe
| 96388 ||  || — || January 26, 1998 || Dossobuono || L. Lai || — || align=right | 1.8 km || 
|-id=389 bgcolor=#E9E9E9
| 96389 ||  || — || January 26, 1998 || Kitt Peak || Spacewatch || GEF || align=right | 2.7 km || 
|-id=390 bgcolor=#fefefe
| 96390 ||  || — || February 6, 1998 || Farra d'Isonzo || Farra d'Isonzo || — || align=right | 3.4 km || 
|-id=391 bgcolor=#E9E9E9
| 96391 ||  || — || February 6, 1998 || Xinglong || SCAP || — || align=right | 3.7 km || 
|-id=392 bgcolor=#fefefe
| 96392 || 1998 DH || — || February 17, 1998 || Modra || A. Galád, A. Pravda || — || align=right | 3.2 km || 
|-id=393 bgcolor=#fefefe
| 96393 ||  || — || February 19, 1998 || Kleť || Kleť Obs. || — || align=right | 1.6 km || 
|-id=394 bgcolor=#fefefe
| 96394 ||  || — || February 23, 1998 || Kitt Peak || Spacewatch || MAS || align=right | 1.8 km || 
|-id=395 bgcolor=#fefefe
| 96395 ||  || — || February 23, 1998 || Kitt Peak || Spacewatch || — || align=right | 1.7 km || 
|-id=396 bgcolor=#fefefe
| 96396 ||  || — || February 24, 1998 || Kitt Peak || Spacewatch || MAS || align=right | 1.8 km || 
|-id=397 bgcolor=#fefefe
| 96397 ||  || — || February 27, 1998 || Caussols || ODAS || NYS || align=right | 1.5 km || 
|-id=398 bgcolor=#fefefe
| 96398 ||  || — || February 27, 1998 || Caussols || ODAS || NYS || align=right | 1.2 km || 
|-id=399 bgcolor=#fefefe
| 96399 ||  || — || February 22, 1998 || Haleakala || NEAT || — || align=right | 5.1 km || 
|-id=400 bgcolor=#fefefe
| 96400 ||  || — || February 22, 1998 || Haleakala || NEAT || NYS || align=right | 1.7 km || 
|}

96401–96500 

|-bgcolor=#fefefe
| 96401 ||  || — || February 24, 1998 || Haleakala || NEAT || — || align=right | 4.7 km || 
|-id=402 bgcolor=#fefefe
| 96402 ||  || — || February 23, 1998 || Kitt Peak || Spacewatch || V || align=right | 1.3 km || 
|-id=403 bgcolor=#fefefe
| 96403 ||  || — || February 24, 1998 || Kitt Peak || Spacewatch || V || align=right | 1.3 km || 
|-id=404 bgcolor=#fefefe
| 96404 ||  || — || February 23, 1998 || Kitt Peak || Spacewatch || — || align=right | 1.5 km || 
|-id=405 bgcolor=#fefefe
| 96405 || 1998 ES || — || March 2, 1998 || Caussols || ODAS || ERI || align=right | 5.1 km || 
|-id=406 bgcolor=#fefefe
| 96406 ||  || — || March 2, 1998 || Xinglong || SCAP || — || align=right | 1.7 km || 
|-id=407 bgcolor=#fefefe
| 96407 ||  || — || March 5, 1998 || Xinglong || SCAP || MAS || align=right | 1.3 km || 
|-id=408 bgcolor=#fefefe
| 96408 ||  || — || March 5, 1998 || Xinglong || SCAP || — || align=right | 1.8 km || 
|-id=409 bgcolor=#E9E9E9
| 96409 ||  || — || March 1, 1998 || La Silla || E. W. Elst || EUN || align=right | 3.2 km || 
|-id=410 bgcolor=#fefefe
| 96410 ||  || — || March 1, 1998 || La Silla || E. W. Elst || NYS || align=right | 1.4 km || 
|-id=411 bgcolor=#fefefe
| 96411 ||  || — || March 1, 1998 || La Silla || E. W. Elst || — || align=right | 2.2 km || 
|-id=412 bgcolor=#fefefe
| 96412 ||  || — || March 1, 1998 || La Silla || E. W. Elst || — || align=right | 2.3 km || 
|-id=413 bgcolor=#fefefe
| 96413 ||  || — || March 1, 1998 || La Silla || E. W. Elst || — || align=right | 1.9 km || 
|-id=414 bgcolor=#fefefe
| 96414 ||  || — || March 3, 1998 || La Silla || E. W. Elst || — || align=right | 1.8 km || 
|-id=415 bgcolor=#fefefe
| 96415 ||  || — || March 22, 1998 || Prescott || P. G. Comba || NYS || align=right | 1.3 km || 
|-id=416 bgcolor=#fefefe
| 96416 ||  || — || March 22, 1998 || Socorro || LINEAR || PHO || align=right | 2.4 km || 
|-id=417 bgcolor=#fefefe
| 96417 ||  || — || March 18, 1998 || Kitt Peak || Spacewatch || NYS || align=right | 1.6 km || 
|-id=418 bgcolor=#E9E9E9
| 96418 ||  || — || March 25, 1998 || Caussols || ODAS || MIT || align=right | 4.1 km || 
|-id=419 bgcolor=#fefefe
| 96419 ||  || — || March 20, 1998 || Socorro || LINEAR || — || align=right | 2.4 km || 
|-id=420 bgcolor=#fefefe
| 96420 ||  || — || March 20, 1998 || Socorro || LINEAR || NYS || align=right | 2.2 km || 
|-id=421 bgcolor=#fefefe
| 96421 ||  || — || March 20, 1998 || Socorro || LINEAR || NYS || align=right | 1.4 km || 
|-id=422 bgcolor=#fefefe
| 96422 ||  || — || March 20, 1998 || Socorro || LINEAR || NYS || align=right | 1.6 km || 
|-id=423 bgcolor=#fefefe
| 96423 ||  || — || March 20, 1998 || Socorro || LINEAR || — || align=right | 2.4 km || 
|-id=424 bgcolor=#fefefe
| 96424 ||  || — || March 20, 1998 || Socorro || LINEAR || — || align=right | 1.8 km || 
|-id=425 bgcolor=#fefefe
| 96425 ||  || — || March 20, 1998 || Socorro || LINEAR || — || align=right | 1.8 km || 
|-id=426 bgcolor=#fefefe
| 96426 ||  || — || March 20, 1998 || Socorro || LINEAR || — || align=right | 1.8 km || 
|-id=427 bgcolor=#fefefe
| 96427 ||  || — || March 20, 1998 || Socorro || LINEAR || — || align=right | 5.4 km || 
|-id=428 bgcolor=#fefefe
| 96428 ||  || — || March 20, 1998 || Socorro || LINEAR || — || align=right | 1.7 km || 
|-id=429 bgcolor=#E9E9E9
| 96429 ||  || — || March 20, 1998 || Socorro || LINEAR || — || align=right | 2.4 km || 
|-id=430 bgcolor=#fefefe
| 96430 ||  || — || March 20, 1998 || Socorro || LINEAR || V || align=right | 1.4 km || 
|-id=431 bgcolor=#fefefe
| 96431 ||  || — || March 20, 1998 || Socorro || LINEAR || NYS || align=right | 1.6 km || 
|-id=432 bgcolor=#E9E9E9
| 96432 ||  || — || March 20, 1998 || Socorro || LINEAR || — || align=right | 1.9 km || 
|-id=433 bgcolor=#fefefe
| 96433 ||  || — || March 20, 1998 || Socorro || LINEAR || V || align=right | 1.4 km || 
|-id=434 bgcolor=#fefefe
| 96434 ||  || — || March 20, 1998 || Socorro || LINEAR || — || align=right | 2.2 km || 
|-id=435 bgcolor=#fefefe
| 96435 ||  || — || March 20, 1998 || Socorro || LINEAR || NYS || align=right | 1.5 km || 
|-id=436 bgcolor=#fefefe
| 96436 ||  || — || March 28, 1998 || Woomera || F. B. Zoltowski || V || align=right | 2.4 km || 
|-id=437 bgcolor=#fefefe
| 96437 ||  || — || March 24, 1998 || Socorro || LINEAR || — || align=right | 2.6 km || 
|-id=438 bgcolor=#fefefe
| 96438 ||  || — || March 24, 1998 || Socorro || LINEAR || PHO || align=right | 1.7 km || 
|-id=439 bgcolor=#E9E9E9
| 96439 ||  || — || March 24, 1998 || Socorro || LINEAR || EUN || align=right | 3.1 km || 
|-id=440 bgcolor=#E9E9E9
| 96440 ||  || — || March 24, 1998 || Socorro || LINEAR || — || align=right | 2.6 km || 
|-id=441 bgcolor=#fefefe
| 96441 ||  || — || March 24, 1998 || Socorro || LINEAR || V || align=right | 1.5 km || 
|-id=442 bgcolor=#fefefe
| 96442 ||  || — || March 24, 1998 || Socorro || LINEAR || — || align=right | 2.6 km || 
|-id=443 bgcolor=#fefefe
| 96443 ||  || — || March 31, 1998 || Socorro || LINEAR || — || align=right | 2.4 km || 
|-id=444 bgcolor=#fefefe
| 96444 ||  || — || March 31, 1998 || Socorro || LINEAR || — || align=right | 4.5 km || 
|-id=445 bgcolor=#fefefe
| 96445 ||  || — || March 31, 1998 || Socorro || LINEAR || — || align=right | 2.4 km || 
|-id=446 bgcolor=#fefefe
| 96446 ||  || — || March 20, 1998 || Socorro || LINEAR || NYS || align=right | 4.6 km || 
|-id=447 bgcolor=#fefefe
| 96447 ||  || — || March 22, 1998 || Socorro || LINEAR || — || align=right | 1.6 km || 
|-id=448 bgcolor=#E9E9E9
| 96448 ||  || — || March 28, 1998 || Socorro || LINEAR || — || align=right | 4.2 km || 
|-id=449 bgcolor=#E9E9E9
| 96449 ||  || — || April 3, 1998 || Oohira || T. Urata || — || align=right | 3.4 km || 
|-id=450 bgcolor=#E9E9E9
| 96450 ||  || — || April 2, 1998 || Socorro || LINEAR || MIT || align=right | 5.4 km || 
|-id=451 bgcolor=#E9E9E9
| 96451 ||  || — || April 2, 1998 || Socorro || LINEAR || EUN || align=right | 2.8 km || 
|-id=452 bgcolor=#E9E9E9
| 96452 ||  || — || April 2, 1998 || Socorro || LINEAR || — || align=right | 4.0 km || 
|-id=453 bgcolor=#E9E9E9
| 96453 ||  || — || April 2, 1998 || Socorro || LINEAR || — || align=right | 3.4 km || 
|-id=454 bgcolor=#fefefe
| 96454 || 1998 HR || — || April 17, 1998 || Kitt Peak || Spacewatch || — || align=right | 2.0 km || 
|-id=455 bgcolor=#fefefe
| 96455 ||  || — || April 20, 1998 || Socorro || LINEAR || NYS || align=right | 1.2 km || 
|-id=456 bgcolor=#E9E9E9
| 96456 ||  || — || April 20, 1998 || Socorro || LINEAR || — || align=right | 2.3 km || 
|-id=457 bgcolor=#E9E9E9
| 96457 ||  || — || April 28, 1998 || Kitt Peak || Spacewatch || — || align=right | 2.7 km || 
|-id=458 bgcolor=#E9E9E9
| 96458 ||  || — || April 17, 1998 || Kitt Peak || Spacewatch || — || align=right | 2.3 km || 
|-id=459 bgcolor=#fefefe
| 96459 ||  || — || April 20, 1998 || Socorro || LINEAR || NYS || align=right | 1.9 km || 
|-id=460 bgcolor=#E9E9E9
| 96460 ||  || — || April 20, 1998 || Socorro || LINEAR || — || align=right | 2.5 km || 
|-id=461 bgcolor=#fefefe
| 96461 ||  || — || April 20, 1998 || Socorro || LINEAR || — || align=right | 1.4 km || 
|-id=462 bgcolor=#fefefe
| 96462 ||  || — || April 20, 1998 || Socorro || LINEAR || — || align=right | 2.3 km || 
|-id=463 bgcolor=#fefefe
| 96463 ||  || — || April 30, 1998 || Anderson Mesa || LONEOS || ERI || align=right | 5.1 km || 
|-id=464 bgcolor=#fefefe
| 96464 ||  || — || April 21, 1998 || Socorro || LINEAR || — || align=right | 3.4 km || 
|-id=465 bgcolor=#fefefe
| 96465 ||  || — || April 21, 1998 || Socorro || LINEAR || EUT || align=right | 3.9 km || 
|-id=466 bgcolor=#E9E9E9
| 96466 ||  || — || April 21, 1998 || Socorro || LINEAR || — || align=right | 2.3 km || 
|-id=467 bgcolor=#fefefe
| 96467 ||  || — || April 21, 1998 || Socorro || LINEAR || NYS || align=right | 1.8 km || 
|-id=468 bgcolor=#fefefe
| 96468 ||  || — || April 21, 1998 || Socorro || LINEAR || MAS || align=right | 1.7 km || 
|-id=469 bgcolor=#E9E9E9
| 96469 ||  || — || April 21, 1998 || Socorro || LINEAR || — || align=right | 2.8 km || 
|-id=470 bgcolor=#fefefe
| 96470 ||  || — || April 25, 1998 || La Silla || E. W. Elst || NYS || align=right | 1.4 km || 
|-id=471 bgcolor=#E9E9E9
| 96471 ||  || — || April 23, 1998 || Socorro || LINEAR || — || align=right | 2.9 km || 
|-id=472 bgcolor=#fefefe
| 96472 ||  || — || April 23, 1998 || Socorro || LINEAR || — || align=right | 4.9 km || 
|-id=473 bgcolor=#E9E9E9
| 96473 ||  || — || April 23, 1998 || Socorro || LINEAR || — || align=right | 4.0 km || 
|-id=474 bgcolor=#fefefe
| 96474 ||  || — || April 23, 1998 || Socorro || LINEAR || — || align=right | 1.9 km || 
|-id=475 bgcolor=#fefefe
| 96475 ||  || — || April 25, 1998 || La Silla || E. W. Elst || — || align=right | 2.6 km || 
|-id=476 bgcolor=#fefefe
| 96476 ||  || — || April 18, 1998 || Socorro || LINEAR || — || align=right | 1.9 km || 
|-id=477 bgcolor=#fefefe
| 96477 ||  || — || April 18, 1998 || Socorro || LINEAR || MAS || align=right | 1.5 km || 
|-id=478 bgcolor=#fefefe
| 96478 ||  || — || April 19, 1998 || Socorro || LINEAR || V || align=right | 1.6 km || 
|-id=479 bgcolor=#fefefe
| 96479 ||  || — || April 19, 1998 || Socorro || LINEAR || — || align=right | 2.0 km || 
|-id=480 bgcolor=#fefefe
| 96480 ||  || — || April 21, 1998 || Socorro || LINEAR || FLO || align=right | 3.3 km || 
|-id=481 bgcolor=#fefefe
| 96481 ||  || — || April 21, 1998 || Socorro || LINEAR || — || align=right | 2.0 km || 
|-id=482 bgcolor=#E9E9E9
| 96482 ||  || — || April 21, 1998 || Socorro || LINEAR || — || align=right | 2.8 km || 
|-id=483 bgcolor=#E9E9E9
| 96483 ||  || — || April 21, 1998 || Socorro || LINEAR || — || align=right | 2.5 km || 
|-id=484 bgcolor=#fefefe
| 96484 ||  || — || April 21, 1998 || Socorro || LINEAR || — || align=right | 3.6 km || 
|-id=485 bgcolor=#E9E9E9
| 96485 ||  || — || April 23, 1998 || Socorro || LINEAR || EUN || align=right | 3.3 km || 
|-id=486 bgcolor=#E9E9E9
| 96486 ||  || — || April 25, 1998 || La Silla || E. W. Elst || EUN || align=right | 2.4 km || 
|-id=487 bgcolor=#FA8072
| 96487 ||  || — || May 1, 1998 || Haleakala || NEAT || — || align=right | 4.5 km || 
|-id=488 bgcolor=#E9E9E9
| 96488 ||  || — || May 6, 1998 || Caussols || ODAS || — || align=right | 3.8 km || 
|-id=489 bgcolor=#E9E9E9
| 96489 ||  || — || May 23, 1998 || Socorro || LINEAR || — || align=right | 6.3 km || 
|-id=490 bgcolor=#fefefe
| 96490 ||  || — || May 23, 1998 || Anderson Mesa || LONEOS || — || align=right | 2.4 km || 
|-id=491 bgcolor=#E9E9E9
| 96491 ||  || — || May 23, 1998 || Anderson Mesa || LONEOS || ADE || align=right | 5.5 km || 
|-id=492 bgcolor=#E9E9E9
| 96492 ||  || — || May 28, 1998 || Prescott || P. G. Comba || — || align=right | 4.1 km || 
|-id=493 bgcolor=#E9E9E9
| 96493 ||  || — || May 19, 1998 || Kitt Peak || Spacewatch || — || align=right | 3.2 km || 
|-id=494 bgcolor=#E9E9E9
| 96494 ||  || — || May 22, 1998 || Socorro || LINEAR || MIT || align=right | 4.1 km || 
|-id=495 bgcolor=#E9E9E9
| 96495 ||  || — || May 22, 1998 || Socorro || LINEAR || — || align=right | 2.1 km || 
|-id=496 bgcolor=#fefefe
| 96496 ||  || — || May 22, 1998 || Socorro || LINEAR || NYS || align=right | 1.6 km || 
|-id=497 bgcolor=#fefefe
| 96497 ||  || — || May 22, 1998 || Socorro || LINEAR || NYS || align=right | 1.2 km || 
|-id=498 bgcolor=#E9E9E9
| 96498 ||  || — || May 22, 1998 || Socorro || LINEAR || MAR || align=right | 2.6 km || 
|-id=499 bgcolor=#fefefe
| 96499 ||  || — || May 23, 1998 || Socorro || LINEAR || — || align=right | 3.7 km || 
|-id=500 bgcolor=#E9E9E9
| 96500 ||  || — || May 22, 1998 || Socorro || LINEAR || — || align=right | 3.5 km || 
|}

96501–96600 

|-bgcolor=#fefefe
| 96501 ||  || — || May 22, 1998 || Socorro || LINEAR || FLO || align=right | 1.6 km || 
|-id=502 bgcolor=#E9E9E9
| 96502 ||  || — || May 23, 1998 || Socorro || LINEAR || GER || align=right | 2.6 km || 
|-id=503 bgcolor=#E9E9E9
| 96503 ||  || — || June 16, 1998 || Kitt Peak || Spacewatch || — || align=right | 2.0 km || 
|-id=504 bgcolor=#E9E9E9
| 96504 ||  || — || June 20, 1998 || Kitt Peak || Spacewatch || — || align=right | 2.2 km || 
|-id=505 bgcolor=#E9E9E9
| 96505 ||  || — || June 24, 1998 || Socorro || LINEAR || — || align=right | 2.6 km || 
|-id=506 bgcolor=#E9E9E9
| 96506 Oberösterreich ||  ||  || July 26, 1998 || Linz || E. Meyer || — || align=right | 4.0 km || 
|-id=507 bgcolor=#d6d6d6
| 96507 ||  || — || August 19, 1998 || Haleakala || NEAT || YAK || align=right | 7.6 km || 
|-id=508 bgcolor=#E9E9E9
| 96508 ||  || — || August 26, 1998 || Xinglong || SCAP || — || align=right | 3.4 km || 
|-id=509 bgcolor=#d6d6d6
| 96509 ||  || — || August 17, 1998 || Socorro || LINEAR || HYG || align=right | 6.0 km || 
|-id=510 bgcolor=#d6d6d6
| 96510 ||  || — || August 26, 1998 || Caussols || ODAS || THM || align=right | 5.5 km || 
|-id=511 bgcolor=#E9E9E9
| 96511 ||  || — || August 30, 1998 || Kitt Peak || Spacewatch || — || align=right | 2.1 km || 
|-id=512 bgcolor=#E9E9E9
| 96512 ||  || — || August 24, 1998 || Socorro || LINEAR || — || align=right | 5.8 km || 
|-id=513 bgcolor=#d6d6d6
| 96513 ||  || — || August 24, 1998 || Socorro || LINEAR || INA || align=right | 7.1 km || 
|-id=514 bgcolor=#d6d6d6
| 96514 ||  || — || August 24, 1998 || Socorro || LINEAR || — || align=right | 4.1 km || 
|-id=515 bgcolor=#d6d6d6
| 96515 ||  || — || August 24, 1998 || Socorro || LINEAR || — || align=right | 6.3 km || 
|-id=516 bgcolor=#d6d6d6
| 96516 ||  || — || August 19, 1998 || Socorro || LINEAR || — || align=right | 6.4 km || 
|-id=517 bgcolor=#d6d6d6
| 96517 ||  || — || August 26, 1998 || La Silla || E. W. Elst || — || align=right | 6.1 km || 
|-id=518 bgcolor=#fefefe
| 96518 ||  || — || September 14, 1998 || Socorro || LINEAR || H || align=right | 1.2 km || 
|-id=519 bgcolor=#E9E9E9
| 96519 ||  || — || September 10, 1998 || Višnjan Observatory || Višnjan Obs. || — || align=right | 5.5 km || 
|-id=520 bgcolor=#d6d6d6
| 96520 ||  || — || September 14, 1998 || Anderson Mesa || LONEOS || THM || align=right | 4.6 km || 
|-id=521 bgcolor=#d6d6d6
| 96521 ||  || — || September 13, 1998 || Kitt Peak || Spacewatch || — || align=right | 5.1 km || 
|-id=522 bgcolor=#d6d6d6
| 96522 ||  || — || September 14, 1998 || Socorro || LINEAR || THM || align=right | 5.0 km || 
|-id=523 bgcolor=#E9E9E9
| 96523 ||  || — || September 14, 1998 || Socorro || LINEAR || — || align=right | 5.6 km || 
|-id=524 bgcolor=#E9E9E9
| 96524 ||  || — || September 14, 1998 || Socorro || LINEAR || — || align=right | 4.1 km || 
|-id=525 bgcolor=#d6d6d6
| 96525 ||  || — || September 14, 1998 || Socorro || LINEAR || — || align=right | 5.1 km || 
|-id=526 bgcolor=#d6d6d6
| 96526 ||  || — || September 14, 1998 || Socorro || LINEAR || — || align=right | 5.8 km || 
|-id=527 bgcolor=#d6d6d6
| 96527 ||  || — || September 14, 1998 || Socorro || LINEAR || EUP || align=right | 7.1 km || 
|-id=528 bgcolor=#d6d6d6
| 96528 ||  || — || September 14, 1998 || Socorro || LINEAR || THM || align=right | 4.6 km || 
|-id=529 bgcolor=#d6d6d6
| 96529 ||  || — || September 14, 1998 || Socorro || LINEAR || KOR || align=right | 3.5 km || 
|-id=530 bgcolor=#E9E9E9
| 96530 ||  || — || September 14, 1998 || Socorro || LINEAR || ADE || align=right | 7.3 km || 
|-id=531 bgcolor=#d6d6d6
| 96531 ||  || — || September 14, 1998 || Socorro || LINEAR || — || align=right | 5.3 km || 
|-id=532 bgcolor=#d6d6d6
| 96532 ||  || — || September 14, 1998 || Socorro || LINEAR || — || align=right | 5.3 km || 
|-id=533 bgcolor=#d6d6d6
| 96533 ||  || — || September 14, 1998 || Socorro || LINEAR || — || align=right | 5.3 km || 
|-id=534 bgcolor=#d6d6d6
| 96534 ||  || — || September 14, 1998 || Socorro || LINEAR || — || align=right | 5.2 km || 
|-id=535 bgcolor=#fefefe
| 96535 ||  || — || September 20, 1998 || Catalina || CSS || H || align=right | 1.2 km || 
|-id=536 bgcolor=#FFC2E0
| 96536 ||  || — || September 19, 1998 || Anderson Mesa || LONEOS || APO +1km || align=right | 2.8 km || 
|-id=537 bgcolor=#d6d6d6
| 96537 ||  || — || September 22, 1998 || Caussols || ODAS || — || align=right | 4.3 km || 
|-id=538 bgcolor=#E9E9E9
| 96538 ||  || — || September 17, 1998 || Anderson Mesa || LONEOS || — || align=right | 4.6 km || 
|-id=539 bgcolor=#d6d6d6
| 96539 ||  || — || September 24, 1998 || Goodricke-Pigott || R. A. Tucker || TIR || align=right | 6.1 km || 
|-id=540 bgcolor=#d6d6d6
| 96540 ||  || — || September 18, 1998 || Kitt Peak || Spacewatch || — || align=right | 5.6 km || 
|-id=541 bgcolor=#d6d6d6
| 96541 ||  || — || September 20, 1998 || Kitt Peak || Spacewatch || — || align=right | 5.1 km || 
|-id=542 bgcolor=#d6d6d6
| 96542 ||  || — || September 21, 1998 || Kitt Peak || Spacewatch || — || align=right | 5.4 km || 
|-id=543 bgcolor=#d6d6d6
| 96543 ||  || — || September 27, 1998 || Kitt Peak || Spacewatch || — || align=right | 5.3 km || 
|-id=544 bgcolor=#d6d6d6
| 96544 ||  || — || September 28, 1998 || Kitt Peak || Spacewatch || THM || align=right | 5.6 km || 
|-id=545 bgcolor=#d6d6d6
| 96545 ||  || — || September 16, 1998 || Anderson Mesa || LONEOS || — || align=right | 6.6 km || 
|-id=546 bgcolor=#E9E9E9
| 96546 ||  || — || September 16, 1998 || Anderson Mesa || LONEOS || — || align=right | 4.4 km || 
|-id=547 bgcolor=#d6d6d6
| 96547 ||  || — || September 17, 1998 || Anderson Mesa || LONEOS || — || align=right | 6.2 km || 
|-id=548 bgcolor=#d6d6d6
| 96548 ||  || — || September 17, 1998 || Anderson Mesa || LONEOS || — || align=right | 6.4 km || 
|-id=549 bgcolor=#d6d6d6
| 96549 ||  || — || September 26, 1998 || Xinglong || SCAP || VER || align=right | 5.5 km || 
|-id=550 bgcolor=#d6d6d6
| 96550 ||  || — || September 19, 1998 || Socorro || LINEAR || BRA || align=right | 3.1 km || 
|-id=551 bgcolor=#E9E9E9
| 96551 ||  || — || September 26, 1998 || Socorro || LINEAR || — || align=right | 5.3 km || 
|-id=552 bgcolor=#d6d6d6
| 96552 ||  || — || September 26, 1998 || Socorro || LINEAR || — || align=right | 4.9 km || 
|-id=553 bgcolor=#d6d6d6
| 96553 ||  || — || September 26, 1998 || Socorro || LINEAR || KOR || align=right | 3.4 km || 
|-id=554 bgcolor=#d6d6d6
| 96554 ||  || — || September 26, 1998 || Socorro || LINEAR || — || align=right | 11 km || 
|-id=555 bgcolor=#d6d6d6
| 96555 ||  || — || September 26, 1998 || Socorro || LINEAR || HYG || align=right | 6.6 km || 
|-id=556 bgcolor=#d6d6d6
| 96556 ||  || — || September 26, 1998 || Socorro || LINEAR || — || align=right | 4.3 km || 
|-id=557 bgcolor=#d6d6d6
| 96557 ||  || — || September 26, 1998 || Socorro || LINEAR || HYG || align=right | 6.1 km || 
|-id=558 bgcolor=#fefefe
| 96558 ||  || — || September 26, 1998 || Socorro || LINEAR || V || align=right | 1.5 km || 
|-id=559 bgcolor=#d6d6d6
| 96559 ||  || — || September 26, 1998 || Socorro || LINEAR || — || align=right | 7.2 km || 
|-id=560 bgcolor=#d6d6d6
| 96560 ||  || — || September 26, 1998 || Socorro || LINEAR || — || align=right | 5.3 km || 
|-id=561 bgcolor=#d6d6d6
| 96561 ||  || — || September 26, 1998 || Socorro || LINEAR || — || align=right | 6.1 km || 
|-id=562 bgcolor=#FA8072
| 96562 ||  || — || September 26, 1998 || Socorro || LINEAR || — || align=right | 2.1 km || 
|-id=563 bgcolor=#E9E9E9
| 96563 ||  || — || September 26, 1998 || Socorro || LINEAR || — || align=right | 4.6 km || 
|-id=564 bgcolor=#d6d6d6
| 96564 ||  || — || September 26, 1998 || Socorro || LINEAR || — || align=right | 5.4 km || 
|-id=565 bgcolor=#E9E9E9
| 96565 ||  || — || September 26, 1998 || Socorro || LINEAR || AGN || align=right | 2.5 km || 
|-id=566 bgcolor=#d6d6d6
| 96566 ||  || — || October 12, 1998 || Caussols || ODAS || HYG || align=right | 6.5 km || 
|-id=567 bgcolor=#d6d6d6
| 96567 ||  || — || October 13, 1998 || Xinglong || SCAP || — || align=right | 3.6 km || 
|-id=568 bgcolor=#d6d6d6
| 96568 ||  || — || October 15, 1998 || Xinglong || SCAP || THM || align=right | 5.3 km || 
|-id=569 bgcolor=#d6d6d6
| 96569 ||  || — || October 11, 1998 || Anderson Mesa || LONEOS || — || align=right | 5.9 km || 
|-id=570 bgcolor=#d6d6d6
| 96570 ||  || — || October 11, 1998 || Anderson Mesa || LONEOS || HYG || align=right | 6.0 km || 
|-id=571 bgcolor=#d6d6d6
| 96571 ||  || — || October 17, 1998 || Kitt Peak || Spacewatch || — || align=right | 4.7 km || 
|-id=572 bgcolor=#d6d6d6
| 96572 ||  || — || October 23, 1998 || Višnjan Observatory || K. Korlević || — || align=right | 9.8 km || 
|-id=573 bgcolor=#fefefe
| 96573 ||  || — || October 28, 1998 || Socorro || LINEAR || H || align=right | 2.0 km || 
|-id=574 bgcolor=#d6d6d6
| 96574 ||  || — || October 30, 1998 || Goodricke-Pigott || R. A. Tucker || — || align=right | 3.4 km || 
|-id=575 bgcolor=#d6d6d6
| 96575 ||  || — || October 18, 1998 || La Silla || E. W. Elst || HYG || align=right | 6.1 km || 
|-id=576 bgcolor=#d6d6d6
| 96576 ||  || — || October 28, 1998 || Socorro || LINEAR || — || align=right | 7.1 km || 
|-id=577 bgcolor=#d6d6d6
| 96577 ||  || — || October 28, 1998 || Socorro || LINEAR || — || align=right | 4.3 km || 
|-id=578 bgcolor=#d6d6d6
| 96578 ||  || — || November 10, 1998 || Caussols || ODAS || KOR || align=right | 3.2 km || 
|-id=579 bgcolor=#d6d6d6
| 96579 ||  || — || November 10, 1998 || Socorro || LINEAR || — || align=right | 4.1 km || 
|-id=580 bgcolor=#d6d6d6
| 96580 ||  || — || November 10, 1998 || Socorro || LINEAR || AEG || align=right | 7.3 km || 
|-id=581 bgcolor=#d6d6d6
| 96581 ||  || — || November 10, 1998 || Socorro || LINEAR || MEL || align=right | 7.7 km || 
|-id=582 bgcolor=#d6d6d6
| 96582 ||  || — || November 10, 1998 || Socorro || LINEAR || — || align=right | 6.1 km || 
|-id=583 bgcolor=#d6d6d6
| 96583 ||  || — || November 15, 1998 || Sormano || P. Sicoli, F. Manca || — || align=right | 7.3 km || 
|-id=584 bgcolor=#d6d6d6
| 96584 ||  || — || November 14, 1998 || Socorro || LINEAR || — || align=right | 2.8 km || 
|-id=585 bgcolor=#d6d6d6
| 96585 ||  || — || November 17, 1998 || Caussols || ODAS || — || align=right | 5.3 km || 
|-id=586 bgcolor=#d6d6d6
| 96586 ||  || — || November 21, 1998 || Socorro || LINEAR || THM || align=right | 4.7 km || 
|-id=587 bgcolor=#d6d6d6
| 96587 ||  || — || November 21, 1998 || Socorro || LINEAR || — || align=right | 4.7 km || 
|-id=588 bgcolor=#d6d6d6
| 96588 ||  || — || November 18, 1998 || Socorro || LINEAR || LIX || align=right | 9.3 km || 
|-id=589 bgcolor=#d6d6d6
| 96589 ||  || — || November 18, 1998 || Socorro || LINEAR || THM || align=right | 5.7 km || 
|-id=590 bgcolor=#FFC2E0
| 96590 || 1998 XB || — || December 1, 1998 || Xinglong || SCAP || ATE +1kmslow || align=right data-sort-value="0.88" | 880 m || 
|-id=591 bgcolor=#d6d6d6
| 96591 Emiliemartin || 1998 XY ||  || December 7, 1998 || Caussols || ODAS || THM || align=right | 5.9 km || 
|-id=592 bgcolor=#d6d6d6
| 96592 ||  || — || December 7, 1998 || Caussols || ODAS || — || align=right | 6.0 km || 
|-id=593 bgcolor=#d6d6d6
| 96593 ||  || — || December 10, 1998 || Kitt Peak || Spacewatch || LIX || align=right | 8.7 km || 
|-id=594 bgcolor=#d6d6d6
| 96594 ||  || — || December 10, 1998 || Kitt Peak || Spacewatch || — || align=right | 7.3 km || 
|-id=595 bgcolor=#d6d6d6
| 96595 ||  || — || December 11, 1998 || Kitt Peak || Spacewatch || HYG || align=right | 5.5 km || 
|-id=596 bgcolor=#fefefe
| 96596 ||  || — || December 14, 1998 || Socorro || LINEAR || H || align=right | 1.9 km || 
|-id=597 bgcolor=#d6d6d6
| 96597 ||  || — || December 14, 1998 || Socorro || LINEAR || — || align=right | 6.5 km || 
|-id=598 bgcolor=#d6d6d6
| 96598 ||  || — || December 14, 1998 || Socorro || LINEAR || — || align=right | 5.7 km || 
|-id=599 bgcolor=#d6d6d6
| 96599 ||  || — || December 14, 1998 || Socorro || LINEAR || TIR || align=right | 3.8 km || 
|-id=600 bgcolor=#d6d6d6
| 96600 ||  || — || December 14, 1998 || Socorro || LINEAR || — || align=right | 3.8 km || 
|}

96601–96700 

|-bgcolor=#d6d6d6
| 96601 ||  || — || December 15, 1998 || Socorro || LINEAR || — || align=right | 4.7 km || 
|-id=602 bgcolor=#d6d6d6
| 96602 ||  || — || December 23, 1998 || Xinglong || SCAP || THM || align=right | 4.8 km || 
|-id=603 bgcolor=#d6d6d6
| 96603 ||  || — || December 20, 1998 || Ondřejov || A. Kolář, L. Kotková || — || align=right | 7.3 km || 
|-id=604 bgcolor=#d6d6d6
| 96604 ||  || — || December 25, 1998 || Kitt Peak || Spacewatch || HYG || align=right | 7.3 km || 
|-id=605 bgcolor=#d6d6d6
| 96605 ||  || — || January 7, 1999 || Kitt Peak || Spacewatch || KOR || align=right | 3.3 km || 
|-id=606 bgcolor=#d6d6d6
| 96606 ||  || — || January 7, 1999 || Kitt Peak || Spacewatch || — || align=right | 5.1 km || 
|-id=607 bgcolor=#d6d6d6
| 96607 ||  || — || January 14, 1999 || Kitt Peak || Spacewatch || 7:4 || align=right | 7.5 km || 
|-id=608 bgcolor=#d6d6d6
| 96608 ||  || — || January 15, 1999 || Anderson Mesa || LONEOS || ALA || align=right | 12 km || 
|-id=609 bgcolor=#d6d6d6
| 96609 ||  || — || January 9, 1999 || Mérida || O. A. Naranjo || HIL3:2 || align=right | 11 km || 
|-id=610 bgcolor=#d6d6d6
| 96610 ||  || — || January 16, 1999 || Socorro || LINEAR || — || align=right | 8.7 km || 
|-id=611 bgcolor=#fefefe
| 96611 ||  || — || January 18, 1999 || Kitt Peak || Spacewatch || — || align=right | 1.7 km || 
|-id=612 bgcolor=#fefefe
| 96612 Litipei ||  ||  || February 5, 1999 || Xinglong || SCAP || — || align=right | 2.1 km || 
|-id=613 bgcolor=#fefefe
| 96613 ||  || — || February 12, 1999 || Gekko || T. Kagawa || — || align=right | 1.9 km || 
|-id=614 bgcolor=#d6d6d6
| 96614 ||  || — || February 6, 1999 || Višnjan Observatory || K. Korlević || EUP || align=right | 9.2 km || 
|-id=615 bgcolor=#d6d6d6
| 96615 ||  || — || February 10, 1999 || Socorro || LINEAR || — || align=right | 9.5 km || 
|-id=616 bgcolor=#d6d6d6
| 96616 ||  || — || February 10, 1999 || Socorro || LINEAR || — || align=right | 4.3 km || 
|-id=617 bgcolor=#FA8072
| 96617 ||  || — || February 10, 1999 || Socorro || LINEAR || — || align=right | 3.1 km || 
|-id=618 bgcolor=#fefefe
| 96618 ||  || — || February 10, 1999 || Socorro || LINEAR || FLO || align=right | 1.6 km || 
|-id=619 bgcolor=#fefefe
| 96619 ||  || — || February 12, 1999 || Socorro || LINEAR || — || align=right | 1.9 km || 
|-id=620 bgcolor=#fefefe
| 96620 ||  || — || February 12, 1999 || Socorro || LINEAR || — || align=right | 4.1 km || 
|-id=621 bgcolor=#d6d6d6
| 96621 ||  || — || February 11, 1999 || Socorro || LINEAR || — || align=right | 6.4 km || 
|-id=622 bgcolor=#fefefe
| 96622 || 1999 DY || — || February 18, 1999 || Višnjan Observatory || K. Korlević || V || align=right | 1.7 km || 
|-id=623 bgcolor=#fefefe
| 96623 Leani ||  ||  || March 14, 1999 || Monte Agliale || M. M. M. Santangelo || V || align=right | 1.4 km || 
|-id=624 bgcolor=#fefefe
| 96624 ||  || — || March 12, 1999 || Kitt Peak || Spacewatch || — || align=right | 1.8 km || 
|-id=625 bgcolor=#fefefe
| 96625 ||  || — || March 16, 1999 || Kitt Peak || Spacewatch || MAS || align=right | 1.4 km || 
|-id=626 bgcolor=#fefefe
| 96626 ||  || — || March 22, 1999 || Anderson Mesa || LONEOS || — || align=right | 2.2 km || 
|-id=627 bgcolor=#fefefe
| 96627 ||  || — || March 19, 1999 || Socorro || LINEAR || FLO || align=right | 1.6 km || 
|-id=628 bgcolor=#fefefe
| 96628 ||  || — || March 19, 1999 || Socorro || LINEAR || — || align=right | 3.3 km || 
|-id=629 bgcolor=#fefefe
| 96629 ||  || — || March 19, 1999 || Socorro || LINEAR || KLI || align=right | 2.9 km || 
|-id=630 bgcolor=#fefefe
| 96630 ||  || — || March 19, 1999 || Socorro || LINEAR || FLO || align=right | 2.3 km || 
|-id=631 bgcolor=#FFC2E0
| 96631 ||  || — || March 23, 1999 || Kitt Peak || Spacewatch || AMO +1km || align=right data-sort-value="0.85" | 850 m || 
|-id=632 bgcolor=#E9E9E9
| 96632 ||  || — || April 6, 1999 || Fountain Hills || C. W. Juels || — || align=right | 5.4 km || 
|-id=633 bgcolor=#fefefe
| 96633 ||  || — || April 7, 1999 || Socorro || LINEAR || — || align=right | 4.1 km || 
|-id=634 bgcolor=#fefefe
| 96634 ||  || — || April 9, 1999 || Prescott || P. G. Comba || V || align=right | 1.8 km || 
|-id=635 bgcolor=#fefefe
| 96635 ||  || — || April 10, 1999 || Višnjan Observatory || K. Korlević || V || align=right | 2.1 km || 
|-id=636 bgcolor=#fefefe
| 96636 ||  || — || April 6, 1999 || Anderson Mesa || LONEOS || — || align=right | 2.2 km || 
|-id=637 bgcolor=#fefefe
| 96637 ||  || — || April 7, 1999 || Anderson Mesa || LONEOS || — || align=right | 4.0 km || 
|-id=638 bgcolor=#fefefe
| 96638 ||  || — || April 10, 1999 || Anderson Mesa || LONEOS || FLO || align=right | 1.4 km || 
|-id=639 bgcolor=#fefefe
| 96639 ||  || — || April 11, 1999 || Anderson Mesa || LONEOS || — || align=right | 2.3 km || 
|-id=640 bgcolor=#fefefe
| 96640 ||  || — || April 15, 1999 || Socorro || LINEAR || — || align=right | 2.3 km || 
|-id=641 bgcolor=#fefefe
| 96641 ||  || — || April 6, 1999 || Socorro || LINEAR || FLO || align=right | 1.9 km || 
|-id=642 bgcolor=#fefefe
| 96642 ||  || — || April 6, 1999 || Socorro || LINEAR || FLO || align=right | 2.4 km || 
|-id=643 bgcolor=#fefefe
| 96643 ||  || — || April 7, 1999 || Socorro || LINEAR || NYS || align=right | 1.5 km || 
|-id=644 bgcolor=#fefefe
| 96644 ||  || — || April 7, 1999 || Socorro || LINEAR || — || align=right | 1.8 km || 
|-id=645 bgcolor=#fefefe
| 96645 ||  || — || April 6, 1999 || Socorro || LINEAR || NYS || align=right | 1.6 km || 
|-id=646 bgcolor=#fefefe
| 96646 ||  || — || April 7, 1999 || Socorro || LINEAR || NYS || align=right | 5.1 km || 
|-id=647 bgcolor=#fefefe
| 96647 ||  || — || April 7, 1999 || Socorro || LINEAR || FLO || align=right | 1.3 km || 
|-id=648 bgcolor=#fefefe
| 96648 ||  || — || April 12, 1999 || Socorro || LINEAR || — || align=right | 1.7 km || 
|-id=649 bgcolor=#fefefe
| 96649 ||  || — || April 12, 1999 || Socorro || LINEAR || V || align=right | 1.2 km || 
|-id=650 bgcolor=#fefefe
| 96650 ||  || — || April 15, 1999 || Socorro || LINEAR || V || align=right | 1.4 km || 
|-id=651 bgcolor=#fefefe
| 96651 ||  || — || April 12, 1999 || Socorro || LINEAR || — || align=right | 2.4 km || 
|-id=652 bgcolor=#fefefe
| 96652 || 1999 HA || — || April 16, 1999 || Prescott || P. G. Comba || FLO || align=right | 1.3 km || 
|-id=653 bgcolor=#fefefe
| 96653 ||  || — || April 17, 1999 || Socorro || LINEAR || — || align=right | 2.7 km || 
|-id=654 bgcolor=#fefefe
| 96654 ||  || — || May 8, 1999 || Catalina || CSS || NYS || align=right | 1.6 km || 
|-id=655 bgcolor=#fefefe
| 96655 ||  || — || May 8, 1999 || Catalina || CSS || FLO || align=right | 1.7 km || 
|-id=656 bgcolor=#fefefe
| 96656 ||  || — || May 8, 1999 || Catalina || CSS || — || align=right | 1.6 km || 
|-id=657 bgcolor=#fefefe
| 96657 ||  || — || May 12, 1999 || Socorro || LINEAR || PHO || align=right | 3.1 km || 
|-id=658 bgcolor=#fefefe
| 96658 ||  || — || May 10, 1999 || Socorro || LINEAR || — || align=right | 2.2 km || 
|-id=659 bgcolor=#fefefe
| 96659 ||  || — || May 8, 1999 || Catalina || CSS || — || align=right | 2.1 km || 
|-id=660 bgcolor=#fefefe
| 96660 ||  || — || May 8, 1999 || Catalina || CSS || — || align=right | 3.3 km || 
|-id=661 bgcolor=#fefefe
| 96661 ||  || — || May 14, 1999 || Catalina || CSS || — || align=right | 5.4 km || 
|-id=662 bgcolor=#fefefe
| 96662 ||  || — || May 10, 1999 || Socorro || LINEAR || FLO || align=right | 1.2 km || 
|-id=663 bgcolor=#fefefe
| 96663 ||  || — || May 12, 1999 || Socorro || LINEAR || — || align=right | 1.6 km || 
|-id=664 bgcolor=#fefefe
| 96664 ||  || — || May 15, 1999 || Catalina || CSS || V || align=right | 2.1 km || 
|-id=665 bgcolor=#fefefe
| 96665 ||  || — || May 10, 1999 || Socorro || LINEAR || — || align=right | 2.2 km || 
|-id=666 bgcolor=#fefefe
| 96666 ||  || — || May 10, 1999 || Socorro || LINEAR || — || align=right | 4.2 km || 
|-id=667 bgcolor=#fefefe
| 96667 ||  || — || May 10, 1999 || Socorro || LINEAR || — || align=right | 2.3 km || 
|-id=668 bgcolor=#fefefe
| 96668 ||  || — || May 10, 1999 || Socorro || LINEAR || V || align=right | 2.5 km || 
|-id=669 bgcolor=#fefefe
| 96669 ||  || — || May 10, 1999 || Socorro || LINEAR || MAS || align=right | 1.6 km || 
|-id=670 bgcolor=#fefefe
| 96670 ||  || — || May 10, 1999 || Socorro || LINEAR || NYS || align=right | 4.7 km || 
|-id=671 bgcolor=#fefefe
| 96671 ||  || — || May 10, 1999 || Socorro || LINEAR || V || align=right | 1.7 km || 
|-id=672 bgcolor=#fefefe
| 96672 ||  || — || May 10, 1999 || Socorro || LINEAR || V || align=right | 5.2 km || 
|-id=673 bgcolor=#fefefe
| 96673 ||  || — || May 10, 1999 || Socorro || LINEAR || NYS || align=right | 2.0 km || 
|-id=674 bgcolor=#fefefe
| 96674 ||  || — || May 10, 1999 || Socorro || LINEAR || — || align=right | 2.0 km || 
|-id=675 bgcolor=#fefefe
| 96675 ||  || — || May 10, 1999 || Socorro || LINEAR || NYS || align=right | 1.6 km || 
|-id=676 bgcolor=#fefefe
| 96676 ||  || — || May 10, 1999 || Socorro || LINEAR || MAS || align=right | 2.6 km || 
|-id=677 bgcolor=#fefefe
| 96677 ||  || — || May 10, 1999 || Socorro || LINEAR || — || align=right | 2.1 km || 
|-id=678 bgcolor=#fefefe
| 96678 ||  || — || May 10, 1999 || Socorro || LINEAR || — || align=right | 2.2 km || 
|-id=679 bgcolor=#fefefe
| 96679 ||  || — || May 10, 1999 || Socorro || LINEAR || — || align=right | 2.0 km || 
|-id=680 bgcolor=#fefefe
| 96680 ||  || — || May 10, 1999 || Socorro || LINEAR || V || align=right | 2.1 km || 
|-id=681 bgcolor=#fefefe
| 96681 ||  || — || May 10, 1999 || Socorro || LINEAR || V || align=right | 1.7 km || 
|-id=682 bgcolor=#fefefe
| 96682 ||  || — || May 10, 1999 || Socorro || LINEAR || NYS || align=right | 2.7 km || 
|-id=683 bgcolor=#fefefe
| 96683 ||  || — || May 10, 1999 || Socorro || LINEAR || ERI || align=right | 5.3 km || 
|-id=684 bgcolor=#fefefe
| 96684 ||  || — || May 10, 1999 || Socorro || LINEAR || V || align=right | 1.6 km || 
|-id=685 bgcolor=#fefefe
| 96685 ||  || — || May 10, 1999 || Socorro || LINEAR || FLO || align=right | 1.3 km || 
|-id=686 bgcolor=#fefefe
| 96686 ||  || — || May 10, 1999 || Socorro || LINEAR || V || align=right | 2.3 km || 
|-id=687 bgcolor=#fefefe
| 96687 ||  || — || May 10, 1999 || Socorro || LINEAR || MAS || align=right | 2.0 km || 
|-id=688 bgcolor=#fefefe
| 96688 ||  || — || May 12, 1999 || Socorro || LINEAR || V || align=right | 1.4 km || 
|-id=689 bgcolor=#fefefe
| 96689 ||  || — || May 12, 1999 || Socorro || LINEAR || FLO || align=right | 1.9 km || 
|-id=690 bgcolor=#fefefe
| 96690 ||  || — || May 12, 1999 || Socorro || LINEAR || SUL || align=right | 3.9 km || 
|-id=691 bgcolor=#fefefe
| 96691 ||  || — || May 12, 1999 || Socorro || LINEAR || — || align=right | 3.5 km || 
|-id=692 bgcolor=#fefefe
| 96692 ||  || — || May 12, 1999 || Socorro || LINEAR || FLO || align=right | 1.2 km || 
|-id=693 bgcolor=#E9E9E9
| 96693 ||  || — || May 12, 1999 || Socorro || LINEAR || — || align=right | 3.4 km || 
|-id=694 bgcolor=#E9E9E9
| 96694 ||  || — || May 12, 1999 || Socorro || LINEAR || — || align=right | 2.2 km || 
|-id=695 bgcolor=#fefefe
| 96695 ||  || — || May 10, 1999 || Socorro || LINEAR || V || align=right | 2.3 km || 
|-id=696 bgcolor=#fefefe
| 96696 ||  || — || May 13, 1999 || Socorro || LINEAR || — || align=right | 2.2 km || 
|-id=697 bgcolor=#fefefe
| 96697 ||  || — || May 13, 1999 || Socorro || LINEAR || — || align=right | 2.3 km || 
|-id=698 bgcolor=#fefefe
| 96698 ||  || — || May 13, 1999 || Socorro || LINEAR || V || align=right | 1.9 km || 
|-id=699 bgcolor=#fefefe
| 96699 ||  || — || May 12, 1999 || Socorro || LINEAR || — || align=right | 1.4 km || 
|-id=700 bgcolor=#fefefe
| 96700 ||  || — || May 12, 1999 || Socorro || LINEAR || — || align=right | 2.7 km || 
|}

96701–96800 

|-bgcolor=#fefefe
| 96701 ||  || — || May 12, 1999 || Socorro || LINEAR || V || align=right | 1.4 km || 
|-id=702 bgcolor=#fefefe
| 96702 ||  || — || May 13, 1999 || Socorro || LINEAR || — || align=right | 1.9 km || 
|-id=703 bgcolor=#fefefe
| 96703 ||  || — || May 13, 1999 || Socorro || LINEAR || — || align=right | 2.4 km || 
|-id=704 bgcolor=#fefefe
| 96704 ||  || — || May 13, 1999 || Socorro || LINEAR || — || align=right | 1.8 km || 
|-id=705 bgcolor=#fefefe
| 96705 ||  || — || May 13, 1999 || Socorro || LINEAR || NYS || align=right | 3.8 km || 
|-id=706 bgcolor=#fefefe
| 96706 ||  || — || May 13, 1999 || Socorro || LINEAR || MAS || align=right | 2.1 km || 
|-id=707 bgcolor=#fefefe
| 96707 ||  || — || May 13, 1999 || Socorro || LINEAR || V || align=right | 1.4 km || 
|-id=708 bgcolor=#fefefe
| 96708 ||  || — || May 13, 1999 || Socorro || LINEAR || NYS || align=right | 3.9 km || 
|-id=709 bgcolor=#fefefe
| 96709 ||  || — || May 13, 1999 || Socorro || LINEAR || V || align=right | 1.6 km || 
|-id=710 bgcolor=#fefefe
| 96710 ||  || — || May 12, 1999 || Socorro || LINEAR || — || align=right | 1.5 km || 
|-id=711 bgcolor=#d6d6d6
| 96711 ||  || — || May 8, 1999 || Catalina || CSS || — || align=right | 6.1 km || 
|-id=712 bgcolor=#fefefe
| 96712 ||  || — || May 20, 1999 || Oaxaca || J. M. Roe || — || align=right | 1.6 km || 
|-id=713 bgcolor=#fefefe
| 96713 ||  || — || May 18, 1999 || Kitt Peak || Spacewatch || NYS || align=right | 1.4 km || 
|-id=714 bgcolor=#fefefe
| 96714 ||  || — || May 22, 1999 || Kitt Peak || Spacewatch || V || align=right | 1.6 km || 
|-id=715 bgcolor=#fefefe
| 96715 ||  || — || May 18, 1999 || Socorro || LINEAR || — || align=right | 1.8 km || 
|-id=716 bgcolor=#fefefe
| 96716 ||  || — || May 18, 1999 || Socorro || LINEAR || V || align=right | 1.8 km || 
|-id=717 bgcolor=#fefefe
| 96717 ||  || — || May 18, 1999 || Socorro || LINEAR || NYS || align=right | 1.3 km || 
|-id=718 bgcolor=#fefefe
| 96718 ||  || — || May 18, 1999 || Socorro || LINEAR || NYS || align=right | 1.9 km || 
|-id=719 bgcolor=#E9E9E9
| 96719 ||  || — || May 17, 1999 || Anderson Mesa || LONEOS || — || align=right | 4.6 km || 
|-id=720 bgcolor=#fefefe
| 96720 || 1999 LP || — || June 4, 1999 || Socorro || LINEAR || — || align=right | 3.0 km || 
|-id=721 bgcolor=#FA8072
| 96721 || 1999 LT || — || June 7, 1999 || Catalina || CSS || H || align=right | 1.6 km || 
|-id=722 bgcolor=#fefefe
| 96722 ||  || — || June 10, 1999 || Woomera || F. B. Zoltowski || — || align=right | 2.1 km || 
|-id=723 bgcolor=#E9E9E9
| 96723 ||  || — || June 12, 1999 || Socorro || LINEAR || — || align=right | 3.2 km || 
|-id=724 bgcolor=#fefefe
| 96724 ||  || — || June 9, 1999 || Socorro || LINEAR || — || align=right | 3.1 km || 
|-id=725 bgcolor=#fefefe
| 96725 ||  || — || June 12, 1999 || Kitt Peak || Spacewatch || — || align=right | 1.6 km || 
|-id=726 bgcolor=#fefefe
| 96726 ||  || — || June 13, 1999 || Kitt Peak || Spacewatch || — || align=right | 1.8 km || 
|-id=727 bgcolor=#fefefe
| 96727 ||  || — || June 12, 1999 || Socorro || LINEAR || PHO || align=right | 2.5 km || 
|-id=728 bgcolor=#E9E9E9
| 96728 ||  || — || July 13, 1999 || Socorro || LINEAR || — || align=right | 4.2 km || 
|-id=729 bgcolor=#E9E9E9
| 96729 ||  || — || July 14, 1999 || Socorro || LINEAR || — || align=right | 2.5 km || 
|-id=730 bgcolor=#E9E9E9
| 96730 ||  || — || July 14, 1999 || Socorro || LINEAR || — || align=right | 3.3 km || 
|-id=731 bgcolor=#fefefe
| 96731 ||  || — || July 14, 1999 || Socorro || LINEAR || — || align=right | 1.9 km || 
|-id=732 bgcolor=#E9E9E9
| 96732 ||  || — || July 14, 1999 || Socorro || LINEAR || — || align=right | 3.3 km || 
|-id=733 bgcolor=#fefefe
| 96733 ||  || — || July 14, 1999 || Socorro || LINEAR || — || align=right | 1.9 km || 
|-id=734 bgcolor=#fefefe
| 96734 ||  || — || July 14, 1999 || Socorro || LINEAR || — || align=right | 2.1 km || 
|-id=735 bgcolor=#E9E9E9
| 96735 ||  || — || July 13, 1999 || Socorro || LINEAR || — || align=right | 6.3 km || 
|-id=736 bgcolor=#E9E9E9
| 96736 ||  || — || July 13, 1999 || Socorro || LINEAR || — || align=right | 3.3 km || 
|-id=737 bgcolor=#E9E9E9
| 96737 ||  || — || July 13, 1999 || Socorro || LINEAR || ADE || align=right | 5.2 km || 
|-id=738 bgcolor=#E9E9E9
| 96738 ||  || — || July 12, 1999 || Socorro || LINEAR || EUN || align=right | 3.0 km || 
|-id=739 bgcolor=#E9E9E9
| 96739 ||  || — || July 12, 1999 || Socorro || LINEAR || EUN || align=right | 3.0 km || 
|-id=740 bgcolor=#E9E9E9
| 96740 ||  || — || July 12, 1999 || Socorro || LINEAR || EUN || align=right | 3.1 km || 
|-id=741 bgcolor=#E9E9E9
| 96741 ||  || — || July 13, 1999 || Socorro || LINEAR || — || align=right | 2.8 km || 
|-id=742 bgcolor=#E9E9E9
| 96742 || 1999 ON || — || July 17, 1999 || Reedy Creek || J. Broughton || — || align=right | 2.7 km || 
|-id=743 bgcolor=#E9E9E9
| 96743 ||  || — || July 22, 1999 || Socorro || LINEAR || GER || align=right | 3.5 km || 
|-id=744 bgcolor=#FFC2E0
| 96744 ||  || — || July 18, 1999 || Mauna Kea || D. J. Tholen, R. J. Whiteley || APO +1km || align=right | 3.8 km || 
|-id=745 bgcolor=#fefefe
| 96745 || 1999 PB || — || August 2, 1999 || Gekko || T. Kagawa || — || align=right | 2.0 km || 
|-id=746 bgcolor=#E9E9E9
| 96746 ||  || — || August 13, 1999 || Anderson Mesa || LONEOS || RAF || align=right | 1.8 km || 
|-id=747 bgcolor=#E9E9E9
| 96747 Crespodasilva ||  ||  || August 16, 1999 || WAO || L. Crespo da Silva || — || align=right | 3.4 km || 
|-id=748 bgcolor=#E9E9E9
| 96748 ||  || — || September 5, 1999 || Catalina || CSS || EUN || align=right | 3.1 km || 
|-id=749 bgcolor=#E9E9E9
| 96749 ||  || — || September 5, 1999 || Catalina || CSS || — || align=right | 2.0 km || 
|-id=750 bgcolor=#fefefe
| 96750 ||  || — || September 4, 1999 || Kitt Peak || Spacewatch || — || align=right | 2.8 km || 
|-id=751 bgcolor=#E9E9E9
| 96751 ||  || — || September 7, 1999 || Socorro || LINEAR || — || align=right | 3.5 km || 
|-id=752 bgcolor=#E9E9E9
| 96752 ||  || — || September 7, 1999 || Socorro || LINEAR || — || align=right | 1.7 km || 
|-id=753 bgcolor=#E9E9E9
| 96753 ||  || — || September 7, 1999 || Socorro || LINEAR || HNS || align=right | 2.2 km || 
|-id=754 bgcolor=#E9E9E9
| 96754 ||  || — || September 7, 1999 || Socorro || LINEAR || HEN || align=right | 2.1 km || 
|-id=755 bgcolor=#E9E9E9
| 96755 ||  || — || September 7, 1999 || Socorro || LINEAR || — || align=right | 3.0 km || 
|-id=756 bgcolor=#E9E9E9
| 96756 ||  || — || September 7, 1999 || Socorro || LINEAR || ADE || align=right | 6.0 km || 
|-id=757 bgcolor=#E9E9E9
| 96757 ||  || — || September 7, 1999 || Socorro || LINEAR || — || align=right | 2.2 km || 
|-id=758 bgcolor=#E9E9E9
| 96758 ||  || — || September 7, 1999 || Socorro || LINEAR || NEM || align=right | 4.9 km || 
|-id=759 bgcolor=#E9E9E9
| 96759 ||  || — || September 7, 1999 || Socorro || LINEAR || — || align=right | 2.2 km || 
|-id=760 bgcolor=#E9E9E9
| 96760 ||  || — || September 7, 1999 || Socorro || LINEAR || — || align=right | 3.3 km || 
|-id=761 bgcolor=#E9E9E9
| 96761 ||  || — || September 7, 1999 || Socorro || LINEAR || — || align=right | 2.8 km || 
|-id=762 bgcolor=#E9E9E9
| 96762 ||  || — || September 7, 1999 || Socorro || LINEAR || HNS || align=right | 2.9 km || 
|-id=763 bgcolor=#E9E9E9
| 96763 ||  || — || September 8, 1999 || Socorro || LINEAR || HNS || align=right | 3.5 km || 
|-id=764 bgcolor=#E9E9E9
| 96764 ||  || — || September 9, 1999 || Monte Agliale || S. Donati || — || align=right | 2.2 km || 
|-id=765 bgcolor=#E9E9E9
| 96765 Poznańuni ||  ||  || September 10, 1999 || Ondřejov || P. Pravec, P. Kušnirák || — || align=right | 3.7 km || 
|-id=766 bgcolor=#E9E9E9
| 96766 ||  || — || September 10, 1999 || Črni Vrh || J. Skvarč || — || align=right | 2.5 km || 
|-id=767 bgcolor=#E9E9E9
| 96767 ||  || — || September 7, 1999 || Socorro || LINEAR || HNS || align=right | 3.1 km || 
|-id=768 bgcolor=#fefefe
| 96768 ||  || — || September 7, 1999 || Socorro || LINEAR || ERI || align=right | 4.3 km || 
|-id=769 bgcolor=#E9E9E9
| 96769 ||  || — || September 7, 1999 || Socorro || LINEAR || — || align=right | 2.8 km || 
|-id=770 bgcolor=#E9E9E9
| 96770 ||  || — || September 7, 1999 || Socorro || LINEAR || — || align=right | 3.9 km || 
|-id=771 bgcolor=#E9E9E9
| 96771 ||  || — || September 7, 1999 || Socorro || LINEAR || — || align=right | 3.6 km || 
|-id=772 bgcolor=#E9E9E9
| 96772 ||  || — || September 8, 1999 || Kitt Peak || Spacewatch || — || align=right | 2.0 km || 
|-id=773 bgcolor=#E9E9E9
| 96773 ||  || — || September 7, 1999 || Socorro || LINEAR || — || align=right | 2.4 km || 
|-id=774 bgcolor=#E9E9E9
| 96774 ||  || — || September 7, 1999 || Socorro || LINEAR || — || align=right | 4.3 km || 
|-id=775 bgcolor=#E9E9E9
| 96775 ||  || — || September 7, 1999 || Socorro || LINEAR || — || align=right | 2.7 km || 
|-id=776 bgcolor=#E9E9E9
| 96776 ||  || — || September 7, 1999 || Socorro || LINEAR || — || align=right | 1.9 km || 
|-id=777 bgcolor=#E9E9E9
| 96777 ||  || — || September 7, 1999 || Socorro || LINEAR || — || align=right | 1.7 km || 
|-id=778 bgcolor=#E9E9E9
| 96778 ||  || — || September 7, 1999 || Socorro || LINEAR || — || align=right | 2.4 km || 
|-id=779 bgcolor=#E9E9E9
| 96779 ||  || — || September 7, 1999 || Socorro || LINEAR || — || align=right | 3.9 km || 
|-id=780 bgcolor=#fefefe
| 96780 ||  || — || September 7, 1999 || Socorro || LINEAR || NYS || align=right | 1.5 km || 
|-id=781 bgcolor=#fefefe
| 96781 ||  || — || September 7, 1999 || Socorro || LINEAR || — || align=right | 1.6 km || 
|-id=782 bgcolor=#d6d6d6
| 96782 ||  || — || September 7, 1999 || Socorro || LINEAR || — || align=right | 13 km || 
|-id=783 bgcolor=#E9E9E9
| 96783 ||  || — || September 7, 1999 || Socorro || LINEAR || MAR || align=right | 2.8 km || 
|-id=784 bgcolor=#E9E9E9
| 96784 ||  || — || September 8, 1999 || Socorro || LINEAR || — || align=right | 4.0 km || 
|-id=785 bgcolor=#E9E9E9
| 96785 ||  || — || September 8, 1999 || Socorro || LINEAR || — || align=right | 3.2 km || 
|-id=786 bgcolor=#E9E9E9
| 96786 ||  || — || September 8, 1999 || Socorro || LINEAR || EUN || align=right | 2.8 km || 
|-id=787 bgcolor=#E9E9E9
| 96787 ||  || — || September 8, 1999 || Socorro || LINEAR || EUN || align=right | 2.9 km || 
|-id=788 bgcolor=#E9E9E9
| 96788 ||  || — || September 8, 1999 || Socorro || LINEAR || MAR || align=right | 4.1 km || 
|-id=789 bgcolor=#E9E9E9
| 96789 ||  || — || September 8, 1999 || Socorro || LINEAR || — || align=right | 4.6 km || 
|-id=790 bgcolor=#E9E9E9
| 96790 ||  || — || September 8, 1999 || Socorro || LINEAR || — || align=right | 3.4 km || 
|-id=791 bgcolor=#E9E9E9
| 96791 ||  || — || September 8, 1999 || Socorro || LINEAR || — || align=right | 3.3 km || 
|-id=792 bgcolor=#E9E9E9
| 96792 ||  || — || September 8, 1999 || Socorro || LINEAR || — || align=right | 4.3 km || 
|-id=793 bgcolor=#E9E9E9
| 96793 ||  || — || September 8, 1999 || Socorro || LINEAR || — || align=right | 5.2 km || 
|-id=794 bgcolor=#E9E9E9
| 96794 ||  || — || September 9, 1999 || Socorro || LINEAR || — || align=right | 6.6 km || 
|-id=795 bgcolor=#E9E9E9
| 96795 ||  || — || September 9, 1999 || Socorro || LINEAR || — || align=right | 6.4 km || 
|-id=796 bgcolor=#E9E9E9
| 96796 ||  || — || September 9, 1999 || Socorro || LINEAR || EUN || align=right | 2.6 km || 
|-id=797 bgcolor=#E9E9E9
| 96797 ||  || — || September 9, 1999 || Socorro || LINEAR || — || align=right | 3.8 km || 
|-id=798 bgcolor=#E9E9E9
| 96798 ||  || — || September 9, 1999 || Socorro || LINEAR || — || align=right | 1.6 km || 
|-id=799 bgcolor=#E9E9E9
| 96799 ||  || — || September 9, 1999 || Socorro || LINEAR || — || align=right | 2.2 km || 
|-id=800 bgcolor=#fefefe
| 96800 ||  || — || September 9, 1999 || Socorro || LINEAR || FLO || align=right | 1.4 km || 
|}

96801–96900 

|-bgcolor=#E9E9E9
| 96801 ||  || — || September 9, 1999 || Socorro || LINEAR || EUN || align=right | 2.9 km || 
|-id=802 bgcolor=#fefefe
| 96802 ||  || — || September 9, 1999 || Socorro || LINEAR || — || align=right | 2.2 km || 
|-id=803 bgcolor=#E9E9E9
| 96803 ||  || — || September 9, 1999 || Socorro || LINEAR || — || align=right | 3.3 km || 
|-id=804 bgcolor=#E9E9E9
| 96804 ||  || — || September 9, 1999 || Socorro || LINEAR || — || align=right | 3.8 km || 
|-id=805 bgcolor=#E9E9E9
| 96805 ||  || — || September 9, 1999 || Socorro || LINEAR || — || align=right | 2.6 km || 
|-id=806 bgcolor=#E9E9E9
| 96806 ||  || — || September 9, 1999 || Socorro || LINEAR || — || align=right | 4.2 km || 
|-id=807 bgcolor=#E9E9E9
| 96807 ||  || — || September 9, 1999 || Socorro || LINEAR || — || align=right | 1.9 km || 
|-id=808 bgcolor=#fefefe
| 96808 ||  || — || September 9, 1999 || Socorro || LINEAR || NYS || align=right | 1.5 km || 
|-id=809 bgcolor=#E9E9E9
| 96809 ||  || — || September 9, 1999 || Socorro || LINEAR || — || align=right | 2.6 km || 
|-id=810 bgcolor=#E9E9E9
| 96810 ||  || — || September 9, 1999 || Socorro || LINEAR || HEN || align=right | 2.3 km || 
|-id=811 bgcolor=#E9E9E9
| 96811 ||  || — || September 9, 1999 || Socorro || LINEAR || — || align=right | 2.4 km || 
|-id=812 bgcolor=#E9E9E9
| 96812 ||  || — || September 9, 1999 || Socorro || LINEAR || RAF || align=right | 2.1 km || 
|-id=813 bgcolor=#fefefe
| 96813 ||  || — || September 9, 1999 || Socorro || LINEAR || — || align=right | 2.9 km || 
|-id=814 bgcolor=#E9E9E9
| 96814 ||  || — || September 9, 1999 || Socorro || LINEAR || — || align=right | 1.7 km || 
|-id=815 bgcolor=#E9E9E9
| 96815 ||  || — || September 9, 1999 || Socorro || LINEAR || — || align=right | 2.2 km || 
|-id=816 bgcolor=#E9E9E9
| 96816 ||  || — || September 9, 1999 || Socorro || LINEAR || MAR || align=right | 3.1 km || 
|-id=817 bgcolor=#fefefe
| 96817 ||  || — || September 9, 1999 || Socorro || LINEAR || V || align=right | 2.1 km || 
|-id=818 bgcolor=#E9E9E9
| 96818 ||  || — || September 9, 1999 || Socorro || LINEAR || — || align=right | 1.8 km || 
|-id=819 bgcolor=#E9E9E9
| 96819 ||  || — || September 9, 1999 || Socorro || LINEAR || — || align=right | 3.0 km || 
|-id=820 bgcolor=#E9E9E9
| 96820 ||  || — || September 9, 1999 || Socorro || LINEAR || — || align=right | 2.1 km || 
|-id=821 bgcolor=#fefefe
| 96821 ||  || — || September 9, 1999 || Socorro || LINEAR || NYS || align=right | 1.4 km || 
|-id=822 bgcolor=#d6d6d6
| 96822 ||  || — || September 9, 1999 || Socorro || LINEAR || TIR || align=right | 5.7 km || 
|-id=823 bgcolor=#fefefe
| 96823 ||  || — || September 9, 1999 || Socorro || LINEAR || — || align=right | 3.2 km || 
|-id=824 bgcolor=#fefefe
| 96824 ||  || — || September 9, 1999 || Socorro || LINEAR || — || align=right | 2.1 km || 
|-id=825 bgcolor=#E9E9E9
| 96825 ||  || — || September 9, 1999 || Socorro || LINEAR || — || align=right | 5.1 km || 
|-id=826 bgcolor=#E9E9E9
| 96826 ||  || — || September 9, 1999 || Socorro || LINEAR || HEN || align=right | 2.1 km || 
|-id=827 bgcolor=#E9E9E9
| 96827 ||  || — || September 9, 1999 || Socorro || LINEAR || RAF || align=right | 1.8 km || 
|-id=828 bgcolor=#E9E9E9
| 96828 ||  || — || September 9, 1999 || Socorro || LINEAR || — || align=right | 2.2 km || 
|-id=829 bgcolor=#E9E9E9
| 96829 ||  || — || September 9, 1999 || Socorro || LINEAR || — || align=right | 2.0 km || 
|-id=830 bgcolor=#E9E9E9
| 96830 ||  || — || September 9, 1999 || Socorro || LINEAR || — || align=right | 1.9 km || 
|-id=831 bgcolor=#E9E9E9
| 96831 ||  || — || September 8, 1999 || Socorro || LINEAR || — || align=right | 5.5 km || 
|-id=832 bgcolor=#E9E9E9
| 96832 ||  || — || September 8, 1999 || Socorro || LINEAR || EUN || align=right | 2.8 km || 
|-id=833 bgcolor=#E9E9E9
| 96833 ||  || — || September 8, 1999 || Socorro || LINEAR || — || align=right | 5.9 km || 
|-id=834 bgcolor=#E9E9E9
| 96834 ||  || — || September 7, 1999 || Socorro || LINEAR || JUN || align=right | 2.7 km || 
|-id=835 bgcolor=#E9E9E9
| 96835 ||  || — || September 8, 1999 || Socorro || LINEAR || — || align=right | 4.0 km || 
|-id=836 bgcolor=#E9E9E9
| 96836 ||  || — || September 8, 1999 || Socorro || LINEAR || — || align=right | 3.7 km || 
|-id=837 bgcolor=#E9E9E9
| 96837 ||  || — || September 8, 1999 || Socorro || LINEAR || ADE || align=right | 5.1 km || 
|-id=838 bgcolor=#E9E9E9
| 96838 ||  || — || September 8, 1999 || Socorro || LINEAR || GEF || align=right | 5.4 km || 
|-id=839 bgcolor=#E9E9E9
| 96839 ||  || — || September 8, 1999 || Socorro || LINEAR || — || align=right | 3.6 km || 
|-id=840 bgcolor=#E9E9E9
| 96840 ||  || — || September 8, 1999 || Socorro || LINEAR || EUN || align=right | 4.0 km || 
|-id=841 bgcolor=#E9E9E9
| 96841 ||  || — || September 8, 1999 || Socorro || LINEAR || GER || align=right | 3.4 km || 
|-id=842 bgcolor=#E9E9E9
| 96842 ||  || — || September 8, 1999 || Socorro || LINEAR || — || align=right | 4.5 km || 
|-id=843 bgcolor=#E9E9E9
| 96843 ||  || — || September 8, 1999 || Socorro || LINEAR || — || align=right | 2.6 km || 
|-id=844 bgcolor=#E9E9E9
| 96844 ||  || — || September 8, 1999 || Socorro || LINEAR || — || align=right | 3.7 km || 
|-id=845 bgcolor=#E9E9E9
| 96845 ||  || — || September 8, 1999 || Socorro || LINEAR || ADE || align=right | 3.8 km || 
|-id=846 bgcolor=#E9E9E9
| 96846 ||  || — || September 8, 1999 || Socorro || LINEAR || — || align=right | 5.3 km || 
|-id=847 bgcolor=#E9E9E9
| 96847 ||  || — || September 8, 1999 || Socorro || LINEAR || — || align=right | 5.4 km || 
|-id=848 bgcolor=#E9E9E9
| 96848 ||  || — || September 5, 1999 || Anderson Mesa || LONEOS || — || align=right | 2.8 km || 
|-id=849 bgcolor=#E9E9E9
| 96849 ||  || — || September 7, 1999 || Anderson Mesa || LONEOS || BRG || align=right | 3.2 km || 
|-id=850 bgcolor=#E9E9E9
| 96850 ||  || — || September 3, 1999 || Kitt Peak || Spacewatch || — || align=right | 4.2 km || 
|-id=851 bgcolor=#E9E9E9
| 96851 ||  || — || September 7, 1999 || Anderson Mesa || LONEOS || — || align=right | 4.2 km || 
|-id=852 bgcolor=#E9E9E9
| 96852 ||  || — || September 8, 1999 || Catalina || CSS || — || align=right | 2.3 km || 
|-id=853 bgcolor=#E9E9E9
| 96853 ||  || — || September 8, 1999 || Catalina || CSS || — || align=right | 5.1 km || 
|-id=854 bgcolor=#E9E9E9
| 96854 ||  || — || September 8, 1999 || Catalina || CSS || ADE || align=right | 5.4 km || 
|-id=855 bgcolor=#E9E9E9
| 96855 ||  || — || September 8, 1999 || Catalina || CSS || — || align=right | 4.4 km || 
|-id=856 bgcolor=#E9E9E9
| 96856 ||  || — || September 8, 1999 || Catalina || CSS || MAR || align=right | 2.7 km || 
|-id=857 bgcolor=#E9E9E9
| 96857 ||  || — || September 4, 1999 || Anderson Mesa || LONEOS || NEM || align=right | 5.8 km || 
|-id=858 bgcolor=#E9E9E9
| 96858 ||  || — || September 18, 1999 || Socorro || LINEAR || — || align=right | 5.3 km || 
|-id=859 bgcolor=#E9E9E9
| 96859 ||  || — || September 18, 1999 || Socorro || LINEAR || — || align=right | 9.9 km || 
|-id=860 bgcolor=#fefefe
| 96860 ||  || — || September 22, 1999 || Višnjan Observatory || K. Korlević || — || align=right | 3.8 km || 
|-id=861 bgcolor=#E9E9E9
| 96861 ||  || — || September 30, 1999 || Socorro || LINEAR || — || align=right | 4.3 km || 
|-id=862 bgcolor=#E9E9E9
| 96862 ||  || — || September 29, 1999 || Socorro || LINEAR || — || align=right | 4.2 km || 
|-id=863 bgcolor=#E9E9E9
| 96863 ||  || — || September 29, 1999 || Socorro || LINEAR || — || align=right | 2.7 km || 
|-id=864 bgcolor=#E9E9E9
| 96864 ||  || — || September 29, 1999 || Socorro || LINEAR || MIT || align=right | 6.7 km || 
|-id=865 bgcolor=#E9E9E9
| 96865 ||  || — || September 30, 1999 || Socorro || LINEAR || JUN || align=right | 2.7 km || 
|-id=866 bgcolor=#E9E9E9
| 96866 ||  || — || September 30, 1999 || Socorro || LINEAR || — || align=right | 4.4 km || 
|-id=867 bgcolor=#E9E9E9
| 96867 ||  || — || September 30, 1999 || Socorro || LINEAR || — || align=right | 3.7 km || 
|-id=868 bgcolor=#E9E9E9
| 96868 ||  || — || September 30, 1999 || Catalina || CSS || — || align=right | 3.4 km || 
|-id=869 bgcolor=#E9E9E9
| 96869 ||  || — || September 30, 1999 || Socorro || LINEAR || — || align=right | 8.1 km || 
|-id=870 bgcolor=#fefefe
| 96870 ||  || — || September 30, 1999 || Kitt Peak || Spacewatch || — || align=right | 2.3 km || 
|-id=871 bgcolor=#E9E9E9
| 96871 ||  || — || September 18, 1999 || Socorro || LINEAR || — || align=right | 2.9 km || 
|-id=872 bgcolor=#E9E9E9
| 96872 ||  || — || October 2, 1999 || Fountain Hills || C. W. Juels || EUN || align=right | 3.8 km || 
|-id=873 bgcolor=#E9E9E9
| 96873 ||  || — || October 3, 1999 || Socorro || LINEAR || — || align=right | 4.1 km || 
|-id=874 bgcolor=#E9E9E9
| 96874 ||  || — || October 6, 1999 || Fountain Hills || C. W. Juels || — || align=right | 5.2 km || 
|-id=875 bgcolor=#E9E9E9
| 96875 ||  || — || October 8, 1999 || Prescott || P. G. Comba || — || align=right | 2.0 km || 
|-id=876 bgcolor=#E9E9E9
| 96876 Andreamanna ||  ||  || October 7, 1999 || Gnosca || S. Sposetti || — || align=right | 3.0 km || 
|-id=877 bgcolor=#E9E9E9
| 96877 ||  || — || October 10, 1999 || Oohira || T. Urata || MAR || align=right | 3.7 km || 
|-id=878 bgcolor=#E9E9E9
| 96878 ||  || — || October 11, 1999 || Črni Vrh || Črni Vrh || JUN || align=right | 2.6 km || 
|-id=879 bgcolor=#E9E9E9
| 96879 ||  || — || October 11, 1999 || Monte Agliale || S. Donati || — || align=right | 3.9 km || 
|-id=880 bgcolor=#E9E9E9
| 96880 ||  || — || October 10, 1999 || Xinglong || SCAP || — || align=right | 2.1 km || 
|-id=881 bgcolor=#E9E9E9
| 96881 ||  || — || October 3, 1999 || Socorro || LINEAR || — || align=right | 5.7 km || 
|-id=882 bgcolor=#E9E9E9
| 96882 ||  || — || October 3, 1999 || Kitt Peak || Spacewatch || — || align=right | 2.0 km || 
|-id=883 bgcolor=#E9E9E9
| 96883 ||  || — || October 4, 1999 || Kitt Peak || Spacewatch || — || align=right | 2.0 km || 
|-id=884 bgcolor=#E9E9E9
| 96884 ||  || — || October 3, 1999 || Socorro || LINEAR || — || align=right | 2.3 km || 
|-id=885 bgcolor=#E9E9E9
| 96885 ||  || — || October 3, 1999 || Socorro || LINEAR || — || align=right | 2.3 km || 
|-id=886 bgcolor=#E9E9E9
| 96886 ||  || — || October 3, 1999 || Socorro || LINEAR || — || align=right | 2.6 km || 
|-id=887 bgcolor=#E9E9E9
| 96887 ||  || — || October 4, 1999 || Socorro || LINEAR || — || align=right | 3.6 km || 
|-id=888 bgcolor=#E9E9E9
| 96888 ||  || — || October 1, 1999 || Catalina || CSS || — || align=right | 2.2 km || 
|-id=889 bgcolor=#E9E9E9
| 96889 ||  || — || October 4, 1999 || Socorro || LINEAR || — || align=right | 6.8 km || 
|-id=890 bgcolor=#fefefe
| 96890 ||  || — || October 3, 1999 || Anderson Mesa || LONEOS || V || align=right | 2.5 km || 
|-id=891 bgcolor=#E9E9E9
| 96891 ||  || — || October 13, 1999 || Anderson Mesa || LONEOS || — || align=right | 3.4 km || 
|-id=892 bgcolor=#E9E9E9
| 96892 ||  || — || October 3, 1999 || Catalina || CSS || — || align=right | 3.5 km || 
|-id=893 bgcolor=#E9E9E9
| 96893 ||  || — || October 3, 1999 || Catalina || CSS || — || align=right | 2.6 km || 
|-id=894 bgcolor=#d6d6d6
| 96894 ||  || — || October 5, 1999 || Catalina || CSS || — || align=right | 5.3 km || 
|-id=895 bgcolor=#E9E9E9
| 96895 ||  || — || October 5, 1999 || Catalina || CSS || MRX || align=right | 3.1 km || 
|-id=896 bgcolor=#E9E9E9
| 96896 ||  || — || October 3, 1999 || Kitt Peak || Spacewatch || HEN || align=right | 2.0 km || 
|-id=897 bgcolor=#E9E9E9
| 96897 ||  || — || October 6, 1999 || Kitt Peak || Spacewatch || — || align=right | 4.6 km || 
|-id=898 bgcolor=#d6d6d6
| 96898 ||  || — || October 6, 1999 || Kitt Peak || Spacewatch || KOR || align=right | 3.1 km || 
|-id=899 bgcolor=#d6d6d6
| 96899 ||  || — || October 6, 1999 || Kitt Peak || Spacewatch || — || align=right | 6.5 km || 
|-id=900 bgcolor=#fefefe
| 96900 ||  || — || October 9, 1999 || Kitt Peak || Spacewatch || NYS || align=right | 1.7 km || 
|}

96901–97000 

|-bgcolor=#E9E9E9
| 96901 ||  || — || October 9, 1999 || Kitt Peak || Spacewatch || HOF || align=right | 5.9 km || 
|-id=902 bgcolor=#E9E9E9
| 96902 ||  || — || October 11, 1999 || Kitt Peak || Spacewatch || NEM || align=right | 5.5 km || 
|-id=903 bgcolor=#d6d6d6
| 96903 ||  || — || October 12, 1999 || Kitt Peak || Spacewatch || — || align=right | 5.1 km || 
|-id=904 bgcolor=#E9E9E9
| 96904 ||  || — || October 2, 1999 || Socorro || LINEAR || — || align=right | 6.2 km || 
|-id=905 bgcolor=#E9E9E9
| 96905 ||  || — || October 2, 1999 || Socorro || LINEAR || — || align=right | 5.4 km || 
|-id=906 bgcolor=#d6d6d6
| 96906 ||  || — || October 2, 1999 || Socorro || LINEAR || — || align=right | 6.2 km || 
|-id=907 bgcolor=#E9E9E9
| 96907 ||  || — || October 2, 1999 || Socorro || LINEAR || — || align=right | 3.0 km || 
|-id=908 bgcolor=#E9E9E9
| 96908 ||  || — || October 2, 1999 || Socorro || LINEAR || — || align=right | 6.0 km || 
|-id=909 bgcolor=#E9E9E9
| 96909 ||  || — || October 2, 1999 || Socorro || LINEAR || — || align=right | 4.2 km || 
|-id=910 bgcolor=#E9E9E9
| 96910 ||  || — || October 2, 1999 || Socorro || LINEAR || EUN || align=right | 3.5 km || 
|-id=911 bgcolor=#E9E9E9
| 96911 ||  || — || October 2, 1999 || Socorro || LINEAR || — || align=right | 3.6 km || 
|-id=912 bgcolor=#d6d6d6
| 96912 ||  || — || October 2, 1999 || Socorro || LINEAR || — || align=right | 3.9 km || 
|-id=913 bgcolor=#E9E9E9
| 96913 ||  || — || October 3, 1999 || Socorro || LINEAR || — || align=right | 5.0 km || 
|-id=914 bgcolor=#E9E9E9
| 96914 ||  || — || October 3, 1999 || Socorro || LINEAR || — || align=right | 2.2 km || 
|-id=915 bgcolor=#fefefe
| 96915 ||  || — || October 3, 1999 || Socorro || LINEAR || — || align=right | 1.7 km || 
|-id=916 bgcolor=#fefefe
| 96916 ||  || — || October 4, 1999 || Socorro || LINEAR || — || align=right | 2.0 km || 
|-id=917 bgcolor=#E9E9E9
| 96917 ||  || — || October 4, 1999 || Socorro || LINEAR || — || align=right | 2.2 km || 
|-id=918 bgcolor=#fefefe
| 96918 ||  || — || October 4, 1999 || Socorro || LINEAR || CIM || align=right | 5.6 km || 
|-id=919 bgcolor=#E9E9E9
| 96919 ||  || — || October 4, 1999 || Socorro || LINEAR || ADE || align=right | 5.0 km || 
|-id=920 bgcolor=#E9E9E9
| 96920 ||  || — || October 4, 1999 || Socorro || LINEAR || AGN || align=right | 2.4 km || 
|-id=921 bgcolor=#fefefe
| 96921 ||  || — || October 4, 1999 || Socorro || LINEAR || — || align=right | 3.0 km || 
|-id=922 bgcolor=#E9E9E9
| 96922 ||  || — || October 4, 1999 || Socorro || LINEAR || — || align=right | 2.5 km || 
|-id=923 bgcolor=#E9E9E9
| 96923 ||  || — || October 4, 1999 || Socorro || LINEAR || — || align=right | 2.9 km || 
|-id=924 bgcolor=#E9E9E9
| 96924 ||  || — || October 4, 1999 || Socorro || LINEAR || — || align=right | 3.1 km || 
|-id=925 bgcolor=#E9E9E9
| 96925 ||  || — || October 4, 1999 || Socorro || LINEAR || — || align=right | 4.4 km || 
|-id=926 bgcolor=#E9E9E9
| 96926 ||  || — || October 4, 1999 || Socorro || LINEAR || — || align=right | 2.4 km || 
|-id=927 bgcolor=#E9E9E9
| 96927 ||  || — || October 15, 1999 || Socorro || LINEAR || — || align=right | 4.5 km || 
|-id=928 bgcolor=#E9E9E9
| 96928 ||  || — || October 6, 1999 || Socorro || LINEAR || — || align=right | 4.5 km || 
|-id=929 bgcolor=#E9E9E9
| 96929 ||  || — || October 6, 1999 || Socorro || LINEAR || — || align=right | 2.9 km || 
|-id=930 bgcolor=#E9E9E9
| 96930 ||  || — || October 6, 1999 || Socorro || LINEAR || — || align=right | 3.8 km || 
|-id=931 bgcolor=#E9E9E9
| 96931 ||  || — || October 6, 1999 || Socorro || LINEAR || — || align=right | 1.9 km || 
|-id=932 bgcolor=#E9E9E9
| 96932 ||  || — || October 6, 1999 || Socorro || LINEAR || — || align=right | 2.6 km || 
|-id=933 bgcolor=#E9E9E9
| 96933 ||  || — || October 6, 1999 || Socorro || LINEAR || — || align=right | 1.6 km || 
|-id=934 bgcolor=#fefefe
| 96934 ||  || — || October 6, 1999 || Socorro || LINEAR || V || align=right | 1.3 km || 
|-id=935 bgcolor=#E9E9E9
| 96935 ||  || — || October 6, 1999 || Socorro || LINEAR || MRX || align=right | 2.2 km || 
|-id=936 bgcolor=#E9E9E9
| 96936 ||  || — || October 6, 1999 || Socorro || LINEAR || MRX || align=right | 2.6 km || 
|-id=937 bgcolor=#E9E9E9
| 96937 ||  || — || October 6, 1999 || Socorro || LINEAR || — || align=right | 2.7 km || 
|-id=938 bgcolor=#E9E9E9
| 96938 ||  || — || October 7, 1999 || Socorro || LINEAR || — || align=right | 5.6 km || 
|-id=939 bgcolor=#fefefe
| 96939 ||  || — || October 7, 1999 || Socorro || LINEAR || — || align=right | 2.1 km || 
|-id=940 bgcolor=#d6d6d6
| 96940 ||  || — || October 7, 1999 || Socorro || LINEAR || KOR || align=right | 3.2 km || 
|-id=941 bgcolor=#E9E9E9
| 96941 ||  || — || October 7, 1999 || Socorro || LINEAR || — || align=right | 7.3 km || 
|-id=942 bgcolor=#E9E9E9
| 96942 ||  || — || October 7, 1999 || Socorro || LINEAR || — || align=right | 2.0 km || 
|-id=943 bgcolor=#E9E9E9
| 96943 ||  || — || October 9, 1999 || Socorro || LINEAR || — || align=right | 3.0 km || 
|-id=944 bgcolor=#E9E9E9
| 96944 ||  || — || October 9, 1999 || Socorro || LINEAR || — || align=right | 1.6 km || 
|-id=945 bgcolor=#d6d6d6
| 96945 ||  || — || October 9, 1999 || Socorro || LINEAR || — || align=right | 5.1 km || 
|-id=946 bgcolor=#E9E9E9
| 96946 ||  || — || October 9, 1999 || Socorro || LINEAR || — || align=right | 5.3 km || 
|-id=947 bgcolor=#E9E9E9
| 96947 ||  || — || October 10, 1999 || Socorro || LINEAR || — || align=right | 2.8 km || 
|-id=948 bgcolor=#E9E9E9
| 96948 ||  || — || October 10, 1999 || Socorro || LINEAR || — || align=right | 2.8 km || 
|-id=949 bgcolor=#E9E9E9
| 96949 ||  || — || October 10, 1999 || Socorro || LINEAR || MRX || align=right | 2.6 km || 
|-id=950 bgcolor=#E9E9E9
| 96950 ||  || — || October 10, 1999 || Socorro || LINEAR || MIS || align=right | 4.3 km || 
|-id=951 bgcolor=#E9E9E9
| 96951 ||  || — || October 10, 1999 || Socorro || LINEAR || — || align=right | 3.1 km || 
|-id=952 bgcolor=#fefefe
| 96952 ||  || — || October 10, 1999 || Socorro || LINEAR || — || align=right | 5.5 km || 
|-id=953 bgcolor=#E9E9E9
| 96953 ||  || — || October 10, 1999 || Socorro || LINEAR || HOF || align=right | 4.1 km || 
|-id=954 bgcolor=#E9E9E9
| 96954 ||  || — || October 10, 1999 || Socorro || LINEAR || — || align=right | 10 km || 
|-id=955 bgcolor=#d6d6d6
| 96955 ||  || — || October 10, 1999 || Socorro || LINEAR || KOR || align=right | 2.8 km || 
|-id=956 bgcolor=#E9E9E9
| 96956 ||  || — || October 12, 1999 || Socorro || LINEAR || MAR || align=right | 2.9 km || 
|-id=957 bgcolor=#E9E9E9
| 96957 ||  || — || October 12, 1999 || Socorro || LINEAR || MAR || align=right | 2.4 km || 
|-id=958 bgcolor=#E9E9E9
| 96958 ||  || — || October 12, 1999 || Socorro || LINEAR || — || align=right | 4.0 km || 
|-id=959 bgcolor=#E9E9E9
| 96959 ||  || — || October 12, 1999 || Socorro || LINEAR || — || align=right | 4.0 km || 
|-id=960 bgcolor=#E9E9E9
| 96960 ||  || — || October 12, 1999 || Socorro || LINEAR || MAR || align=right | 2.4 km || 
|-id=961 bgcolor=#E9E9E9
| 96961 ||  || — || October 12, 1999 || Socorro || LINEAR || MAR || align=right | 2.3 km || 
|-id=962 bgcolor=#E9E9E9
| 96962 ||  || — || October 12, 1999 || Socorro || LINEAR || DOR || align=right | 6.1 km || 
|-id=963 bgcolor=#E9E9E9
| 96963 ||  || — || October 12, 1999 || Socorro || LINEAR || — || align=right | 3.6 km || 
|-id=964 bgcolor=#E9E9E9
| 96964 ||  || — || October 12, 1999 || Socorro || LINEAR || EUN || align=right | 3.7 km || 
|-id=965 bgcolor=#E9E9E9
| 96965 ||  || — || October 12, 1999 || Socorro || LINEAR || EUN || align=right | 2.8 km || 
|-id=966 bgcolor=#E9E9E9
| 96966 ||  || — || October 12, 1999 || Socorro || LINEAR || JUN || align=right | 2.5 km || 
|-id=967 bgcolor=#E9E9E9
| 96967 ||  || — || October 12, 1999 || Socorro || LINEAR || — || align=right | 7.7 km || 
|-id=968 bgcolor=#E9E9E9
| 96968 ||  || — || October 12, 1999 || Socorro || LINEAR || GEF || align=right | 2.5 km || 
|-id=969 bgcolor=#E9E9E9
| 96969 ||  || — || October 12, 1999 || Socorro || LINEAR || — || align=right | 4.4 km || 
|-id=970 bgcolor=#E9E9E9
| 96970 ||  || — || October 12, 1999 || Socorro || LINEAR || — || align=right | 3.7 km || 
|-id=971 bgcolor=#E9E9E9
| 96971 ||  || — || October 12, 1999 || Socorro || LINEAR || CLO || align=right | 4.5 km || 
|-id=972 bgcolor=#d6d6d6
| 96972 ||  || — || October 12, 1999 || Socorro || LINEAR || URS || align=right | 7.2 km || 
|-id=973 bgcolor=#E9E9E9
| 96973 ||  || — || October 12, 1999 || Socorro || LINEAR || — || align=right | 3.2 km || 
|-id=974 bgcolor=#E9E9E9
| 96974 ||  || — || October 12, 1999 || Socorro || LINEAR || GEF || align=right | 5.6 km || 
|-id=975 bgcolor=#E9E9E9
| 96975 ||  || — || October 12, 1999 || Socorro || LINEAR || — || align=right | 2.8 km || 
|-id=976 bgcolor=#E9E9E9
| 96976 ||  || — || October 12, 1999 || Socorro || LINEAR || — || align=right | 4.8 km || 
|-id=977 bgcolor=#E9E9E9
| 96977 ||  || — || October 12, 1999 || Socorro || LINEAR || — || align=right | 3.3 km || 
|-id=978 bgcolor=#E9E9E9
| 96978 ||  || — || October 12, 1999 || Socorro || LINEAR || EUN || align=right | 3.4 km || 
|-id=979 bgcolor=#E9E9E9
| 96979 ||  || — || October 12, 1999 || Socorro || LINEAR || — || align=right | 2.9 km || 
|-id=980 bgcolor=#E9E9E9
| 96980 ||  || — || October 12, 1999 || Socorro || LINEAR || MAR || align=right | 2.8 km || 
|-id=981 bgcolor=#E9E9E9
| 96981 ||  || — || October 13, 1999 || Socorro || LINEAR || ADE || align=right | 3.7 km || 
|-id=982 bgcolor=#E9E9E9
| 96982 ||  || — || October 14, 1999 || Socorro || LINEAR || — || align=right | 5.7 km || 
|-id=983 bgcolor=#E9E9E9
| 96983 ||  || — || October 14, 1999 || Socorro || LINEAR || — || align=right | 5.3 km || 
|-id=984 bgcolor=#E9E9E9
| 96984 ||  || — || October 15, 1999 || Socorro || LINEAR || — || align=right | 2.8 km || 
|-id=985 bgcolor=#E9E9E9
| 96985 ||  || — || October 15, 1999 || Socorro || LINEAR || — || align=right | 4.1 km || 
|-id=986 bgcolor=#E9E9E9
| 96986 ||  || — || October 15, 1999 || Socorro || LINEAR || — || align=right | 5.2 km || 
|-id=987 bgcolor=#E9E9E9
| 96987 ||  || — || October 15, 1999 || Socorro || LINEAR || — || align=right | 2.4 km || 
|-id=988 bgcolor=#E9E9E9
| 96988 ||  || — || October 15, 1999 || Socorro || LINEAR || — || align=right | 2.8 km || 
|-id=989 bgcolor=#d6d6d6
| 96989 ||  || — || October 15, 1999 || Socorro || LINEAR || KOR || align=right | 3.7 km || 
|-id=990 bgcolor=#E9E9E9
| 96990 ||  || — || October 15, 1999 || Socorro || LINEAR || — || align=right | 2.5 km || 
|-id=991 bgcolor=#E9E9E9
| 96991 ||  || — || October 15, 1999 || Socorro || LINEAR || — || align=right | 4.5 km || 
|-id=992 bgcolor=#fefefe
| 96992 ||  || — || October 15, 1999 || Socorro || LINEAR || — || align=right | 1.6 km || 
|-id=993 bgcolor=#E9E9E9
| 96993 ||  || — || October 1, 1999 || Catalina || CSS || EUN || align=right | 3.2 km || 
|-id=994 bgcolor=#E9E9E9
| 96994 ||  || — || October 1, 1999 || Catalina || CSS || GEF || align=right | 2.9 km || 
|-id=995 bgcolor=#E9E9E9
| 96995 ||  || — || October 1, 1999 || Catalina || CSS || — || align=right | 2.6 km || 
|-id=996 bgcolor=#E9E9E9
| 96996 ||  || — || October 2, 1999 || Anderson Mesa || LONEOS || DOR || align=right | 7.2 km || 
|-id=997 bgcolor=#E9E9E9
| 96997 ||  || — || October 2, 1999 || Kitt Peak || Spacewatch || — || align=right | 1.3 km || 
|-id=998 bgcolor=#fefefe
| 96998 ||  || — || October 2, 1999 || Kitt Peak || Spacewatch || NYS || align=right | 1.8 km || 
|-id=999 bgcolor=#E9E9E9
| 96999 ||  || — || October 3, 1999 || Socorro || LINEAR || GEF || align=right | 2.5 km || 
|-id=000 bgcolor=#E9E9E9
| 97000 ||  || — || October 7, 1999 || Catalina || CSS || MAR || align=right | 3.4 km || 
|}

References

External links 
 Discovery Circumstances: Numbered Minor Planets (95001)–(100000) (IAU Minor Planet Center)

0096